= Skakel =

Skakel (/ˈskeɪkəl/ SKAY-kəl) may refer to the following people, belonging to the same family:

- Ethel Kennedy (née Skakel; 1928–2024), American human rights advocate
- George Skakel (1892–1955), American businessman
- Michael Skakel (born 1960), American convicted murderer
