= Murder of Martha Moxley =

1975 murder in Greenwich, Connecticut, U.S.

Martha Moxley
- Born: Martha Elizabeth Moxley; August 16, 1960; San Francisco, California, U.S.
- Died: October 30, 1975 (aged 15); Belle Haven, Greenwich, Connecticut, U.S.
- Cause of death: Homicide by blunt trauma
- Body discovered: October 31, 1975
- Occupation: Student
- Parent(s): Dorthy Moxley, John David Moxley

Martha Elizabeth Moxley (August 16, 1960 – October 30, 1975) was a 15-year-old American high school student from Greenwich, Connecticut, who was murdered in 1975. Moxley was last seen alive spending time at the home of the Skakel family, across the street from her home in Belle Haven. The case attracted worldwide publicity, as the Skakel children were nieces and nephews of Ethel Skakel Kennedy, the widow of United States Senator Robert F. Kennedy.

Michael Skakel, also aged 15 at the time, was convicted in 2002 of murdering Moxley and was sentenced to 20 years to life in prison. Eleven years later, in 2013, Skakel was granted a new trial by a Connecticut judge who ruled that his counsel had been inadequate, and he was released on $1.2 million bail. In 2016, the Connecticut Supreme Court ruled 4–3 to reinstate Skakel's conviction. The Connecticut Supreme Court reversed itself in 2018, and ordered a new trial. On October 30, 2020, the 45th anniversary of Moxley's murder, the state of Connecticut announced it would not retry Skakel for Moxley's murder.

== Murder ==
On the evening of October 30, 1975, Martha Moxley left with friends to participate in "mischief night", in which neighborhood youths would ring bells and pull pranks such as toilet papering houses. According to friends, Moxley began flirting with, and eventually kissed, Thomas Skakel, the older brother of Michael Skakel. Moxley was last seen "falling together behind the fence" with Thomas, near the pool in the Skakel backyard, at around 9:30 p.m.

The next day, Moxley's body was found beneath a tree in her family's backyard. Her pants and underwear were pulled down, but there was no evidence of sexual assault. Pieces of a broken six-iron golf club were found near the body; the autopsy indicated that she had been both bludgeoned and stabbed with it. The club was identified as one of a specific brand and style, and a set of the same brand and style belonged to Skakel's mother. Police collected the set's four-iron from the Skakel residence. A toolmark examiner from the police crime laboratory gave evidence that, based on paint residue and striations on their surfaces, the two clubs were from the same matched set.

== Investigation and trial ==
=== Initial investigation ===
Thomas Skakel was the last person seen with Moxley on the night of the murder. He became the prime suspect, but his father forbade access to his school and mental health records. Kenneth Littleton, who had started working as a live-in tutor for the Skakel family only hours before the murder, also became a prime suspect. However, no one was charged, and the case languished for decades. In the meantime, several books were published about the murder, including Dominick Dunne's fictional account of the case, A Season in Purgatory (1993), Mark Fuhrman's nonfiction Murder in Greenwich (1998), and Timothy Dumas's nonfiction A Wealth of Evil (1999).

Over the years, both Thomas and Michael Skakel significantly changed their alibis for the night of Moxley's murder. Michael claimed that he had been window-peeping and masturbating in a tree beside the Moxley property from 11:30 p.m. to 12:30 a.m. Two former students from Élan School, a treatment center for troubled youths, testified they heard Michael confess to killing Moxley with a golf club. One of the former students, Gregory Coleman, testified that Michael was given special privileges and had bragged, "I'm going to get away with murder. I'm a Kennedy."

=== Investigation reopened ===
When William Kennedy Smith was tried (and acquitted) for rape in 1991, a rumor surfaced that he had been present at the Skakel house on the night of Moxley's death, with the clear insinuation that he might have been involved. Although this proved to be unfounded, it resulted in a new investigation of the then-cold case. The Sutton Associates, a private detective agency hired by Rushton Skakel in 1991, conducted its own investigation of the killing. The Sutton report, later leaked to the media, revealed that both Thomas and Michael altered their stories about their activities the night of the murder.

In 1993, author Dominick Dunne, father of murdered actress Dominique Dunne, published A Season in Purgatory, a fictional story closely resembling the Moxley case. Mark Fuhrman's 1998 book Murder in Greenwich named Michael Skakel as the murderer and pointed out numerous mistakes made during the original police investigation. Even in the years before the Dunne and Fuhrman books, Greenwich police detectives Steve Carroll and Frank Garr, as well as police reporter Leonard Levitt, had become convinced that Skakel was the killer.

=== Trial ===
In June 1998, a rarely invoked one-man grand jury was convened to review the evidence of the case. After an eighteen-month investigation, it was decided there was enough evidence to charge Michael Skakel with murder. On January 9, 2000, an arrest warrant was issued for an unnamed juvenile for Moxley's murder. Michael Skakel surrendered to authorities later that day. He was released shortly thereafter on $500,000 bail. On March 14, Skakel was arraigned for murder in a juvenile court, since he was 15 years old at the time of Moxley's murder. On January 31, 2001, a judge ruled for Skakel to be tried as an adult.

Skakel's trial began on May 7, 2002, in Norwalk, Connecticut. He was represented by attorney Michael Sherman. Skakel's alibi was that at the time of the murder he was at his cousin's house. During the trial, the jury heard part of a taped book proposal, which included Skakel speaking about masturbating in a tree on the night of the murder – possibly the same tree under which Moxley's body was found the next morning. In the book proposal, Skakel did not admit to committing the murder. Prosecutors took words from the book proposal and overlaid them on graphic images of Moxley's dead body in a computerized, multimedia presentation shown to jurors during closing arguments. In the audiotape, Skakel said that he was afraid he might have been seen the previous night "jerking off", and had panicked. Though the jury heard the whole tape, during the closing arguments the prosecutor did not play the portion of the audiotape in which Skakel had said "jerking off", giving the impression that he was confessing to the murder.

On June 7, 2002, Skakel was found guilty of murdering Moxley and was sentenced to 20 years to life in prison. He was assigned to the Garner Correctional Institution in Newtown, Connecticut.

The prosecutors' use of the multimedia presentation during closing arguments was included in Skakel's initial appeal. In their brief responding to that appeal, the prosecution argued:

The state engaged in appropriate and effective advocacy by using trial exhibits to highlight certain evidence and inferences. ... Just as the state should not be deprived of its most valuable evidence unless there is a compelling reason to do so, the state should not be prohibited from making its best arguments. The state's use of audio and photographic exhibits during argument was a matter of effective advocacy. The state did not, as defendant claims, distort the evidence in any respect. By placing certain exhibits next to defendant's words, or by displaying two related exhibits simultaneously, the state was making explicit the inferences it was asking the jury to draw. This is the job of an advocate.

== Michael Skakel ==
Michael Skakel
- Born: Michael Christopher Skakel; September 19, 1960 (age 66); Greenwich, Connecticut, U.S.
- Education: Curry College (BA)
- Spouse: Margot Sheridan (m. 1991; div. 2001)
- Children: 1
- Relatives: Ethel Kennedy (aunt); George Skakel (grandfather); Kathleen Kennedy Townsend (cousin); Joseph P. Kennedy II (cousin); Robert F. Kennedy Jr. (cousin); Michael L. Kennedy (cousin); Kerry Kennedy (cousin); Christopher G. Kennedy (cousin); Max Kennedy (cousin); Douglas Harriman Kennedy (cousin); Rory Kennedy (cousin); Ciarán Cuffe (cousin)
- Status: Released
- Convictions: 20 years to life (conviction vacated, prosecutors not seeking re-trial, case dismissed)
- Criminal charge: Murder (vacated)

Details
- Country: United States
- State: Connecticut
- Location: Greenwich, Connecticut

Michael Christopher Skakel (born September 19, 1960) is the fifth of seven children, born to Rushton Walter Skakel and Anne Reynolds. Rushton's sister Ethel was the widow of United States Senator Robert F. Kennedy. Skakel's grandfather George Skakel was the founder of Great Lakes Carbon Corporation, a coal company that was one of the largest and wealthiest privately held corporations in the United States.

The Skakel family lived in the affluent neighborhood of Belle Haven in Greenwich, Connecticut. After his mother's death from brain cancer in 1973, Skakel began abusing alcohol. He was a poor student and reportedly flunked out of a dozen schools. He also struggled for years with dyslexia, which went undiagnosed until he was aged 26. Skakel's cousin, Robert F. Kennedy, Jr., later wrote that he was a "small sensitive child – the runt of the litter with a harsh and occasionally violent alcoholic father who both ignored and abused him." According to neighbors and family friends, the Skakel children were given unlimited amounts of money and were largely unsupervised.

In 1978, Skakel was arrested for drunk driving in New York State. To avoid criminal charges, his family sent him to the Élan School in Poland, Maine, where he purportedly received treatment for alcoholism. He ran away from the school twice before leaving after two years. Skakel later attended Curry College in Milton, Massachusetts, and earned a bachelor's degree in English. During the 1980s, he attended several drug rehabilitation facilities before finally becoming sober in his twenties. Skakel also pursued a career as a professional athlete; he competed on the international speed skiing circuit and tried out for the speed skiing demonstration team that appeared at the 1992 Winter Olympics in Albertville, France. In 1991, Skakel married professional golfer Margot Sheridan, with whom he has one child. Sheridan filed for divorce shortly after Skakel was arrested for Moxley's murder in January 2000. Their divorce was finalized in 2001.

== Post-trial ==
In January 2003, Robert F. Kennedy, Jr. wrote a controversial article in The Atlantic Monthly titled "A Miscarriage of Justice," insisting that Skakel's indictment "was triggered by an inflamed media and that an innocent man is now in prison." Kennedy argued there was more evidence suggesting that Kenneth Littleton, the Skakel family's live-in tutor, had killed Moxley. He also called Dominick Dunne the "driving force" behind Skakel's prosecution. In July 2016, Kennedy released a book defending Skakel titled Framed.

=== Appeals ===
Skakel continued to fight his conviction. In November 2003, he appealed to the Connecticut Supreme Court, arguing that the trial court erred because the case should have been heard in juvenile court rather than in Superior Court, that the statute of limitations had expired on the charges against him and that there was prosecutorial misconduct. On January 12, 2006, the Connecticut Supreme Court rejected Skakel's claims and affirmed his conviction. Subsequently, Skakel retained attorney and former U.S. Solicitor General Theodore Olson, who filed a petition for a writ of certiorari on behalf of Skakel before the U.S. Supreme Court on July 12, 2006. On November 13, 2006, the Supreme Court declined to hear the case.

In 2007, Skakel's new attorneys, Hope Seeley and Hubert Santos, filed petitions for a writ of habeas corpus and a motion for a new trial in the Connecticut trial court that had originally heard his case, based on a theory involving Gitano "Tony" Bryant, a cousin of Los Angeles Lakers player Kobe Bryant's and a former classmate of Skakel's at the private Brunswick School in Greenwich. In a videotaped August 2003 interview with Vito Colucci, a private investigator hired by Skakel, Bryant said that, on the night of Moxley's murder, one of his friends had wanted to rape her. Bryant said that he did not previously come forward because his mother had warned him that, as a black man, he would be framed for the unsolved murder. A two-week hearing in April 2007 allowed the presentation of this hearsay evidence, among other matters. In September 2007, Skakel's attorneys filed a petition, based in part on Bryant's claims, asking for a new trial. Prosecutors formally responded that Bryant may have made up the story to sell a play about the case.

The new Skakel defense team also hired a full-time investigative team to review existing and new information – particularly a book written about Élan School – in preparation for the hearing. They argued that no Élan residents who knew Skakel, other than Gregory Coleman, had ever spoken about Skakel's confession to anyone, including to the author of the book.

On October 25, 2007, a Superior Court judge denied the request for a new trial, saying that Bryant's testimony was not credible and that there was no evidence of prosecutorial misconduct in the original trial. Skakel's lawyer appealed this decision to the Connecticut Supreme Court. On March 26, 2009, a five-judge panel of the court heard arguments on this appeal. On April 12, 2010, the panel ruled 4–1 against Skakel's appeal.

Skakel then appealed based on charge of incompetence against Michael Sherman, his lead attorney at the trial. In an April 2013 hearing in Vernon, Connecticut, Skakel testified that Sherman, rather than focusing on Skakel's defense, instead had basked in celebrity. Skakel also claimed that Sherman was more interested in collecting fees to settle Sherman's own financial problems than in defending Skakel. Sherman testified in defense of his actions, while continuing to maintain his belief in Skakel's innocence in the Moxley case.

=== Parole hearings ===
Skakel had been imprisoned at the MacDougall-Walker Correctional Institution in Suffield, Connecticut. On January 24, 2012, Skakel and his attorneys argued for a sentence reduction, claiming that he should have been tried in juvenile court. On March 5, 2012, Skakel lost his bid for a sentence reduction.

Skakel's first parole hearing was held on October 24, 2012. Skakel was denied parole. He continued to deny any role in the killing. Skakel's next parole hearing was scheduled for October 2017.

=== 2013 ===
On October 23, 2013, Skakel was granted a new trial by Connecticut judge Thomas A. Bishop, who ruled that Michael Sherman failed to adequately represent Skakel when he was convicted in 2002. Prosecutors stated they would appeal the decision. John Moxley, the victim's brother, said that the ruling took his family by surprise and that the family hoped the state would win on appeal.

In his ruling, Bishop wrote that defense in such a case requires attention to detail, an energetic investigation and a coherent plan of defense, stating:

"Trial counsel's failures in each of these areas of representation were significant and, ultimately, fatal to a constitutionally adequate defense ... As a consequence of trial counsel's failures as stated, the state procured a judgment of conviction that lacks reliability."

On November 21, 2013, Skakel was released on a $1.2 million bond along with other conditions: he was to be monitored with a GPS device; could have no contact with Moxley's family; must periodically check in over the phone; and would not be allowed to leave the state of Connecticut unless granted permission, although he had since relocated to Westchester County, New York.

=== 2016 ===
In December 2016, the Connecticut Supreme Court reinstated Skakel's murder conviction with a 4 –3 majority decision, writing that his conviction was the result of "overwhelming" evidence presented by prosecutors and that his legal representation had been adequate.

=== 2018 ===
In January 2018, prosecutors asked the Connecticut Supreme Court to revoke Skakel's bail and to return him to prison to resume serving his sentence. However, on May 4, the Connecticut Supreme Court vacated Skakel's conviction and ordered a new trial. The court ruled that Sherman had "rendered ineffective assistance" when he failed to contact an alibi witness whose name had been provided by Skakel and that as a result, Skakel was deprived of a fair trial. State prosecutors in Stamford had the power to call for a new trial against Skakel.

=== 2020 ===
On October 30, 2020, chief state's attorney Richard Colangelo informed the Superior Court that Skakel would not be retried, because in Colangelo's judgment, the state would not be able to prove the case beyond a reasonable doubt.

== In popular culture ==
The case was featured on Unsolved Mysteries on February 16, 1996, season 8 episode 11.

The documentary TV series City Confidential covered the Martha Moxley murder in its episode titled "Greenwich: Who Killed Martha Moxley?", originally aired on October 20, 1999.

It inspired the Law & Order Season 11 episode "Amends" which first aired on November 29, 2000.

In 2002 there was a made for TV movie based on Fuhrman's book Murder in Greenwich, sharing the same title. The movie covered the Moxley murder case and Fuhrman's research while writing the book. Several names are changed in the movie.

In its 2003 premiere episode, "Look Again", the TV series Cold Case depicted a fictional version based on Moxley's murder.

The American Court TV (now TruTV) television series Mugshots featured the case in an episode titled "Michael Skakel - A Killing in Greenwich" which aired in 2003.

In 2014, Connecticut-born rapper Apathy released a song titled "Martha Moxley (Rest in Peace)" featuring a sample from George Michael's "Careless Whisper". The song repeatedly, but subtly, references the event, referring to Moxley and Skakel by name.

In September 2017, the rights to Kennedy's book Framed were optioned by FX Productions to develop a multi-part television series.

In June 2019, Oxygen premiered a three-part documentary titled Murder and Justice: The Case of Martha Moxley, hosted by legal analyst and former prosecutor Laura Coates.

On August 10, 2020, Crime Junkie released a podcast on the murder of Martha Moxley.

On May 31, 2026, Morbid Podcast released an episode on the murder of Martha Moxley.

On October 28, 2026, Love/Murder podcast released an episode on the murder of Martha Moxley.

== See also ==
- List of unsolved murders (1900–1979)
