= Christopher G. Kennedy =

American businessman (born 1963)

Chris Kennedy
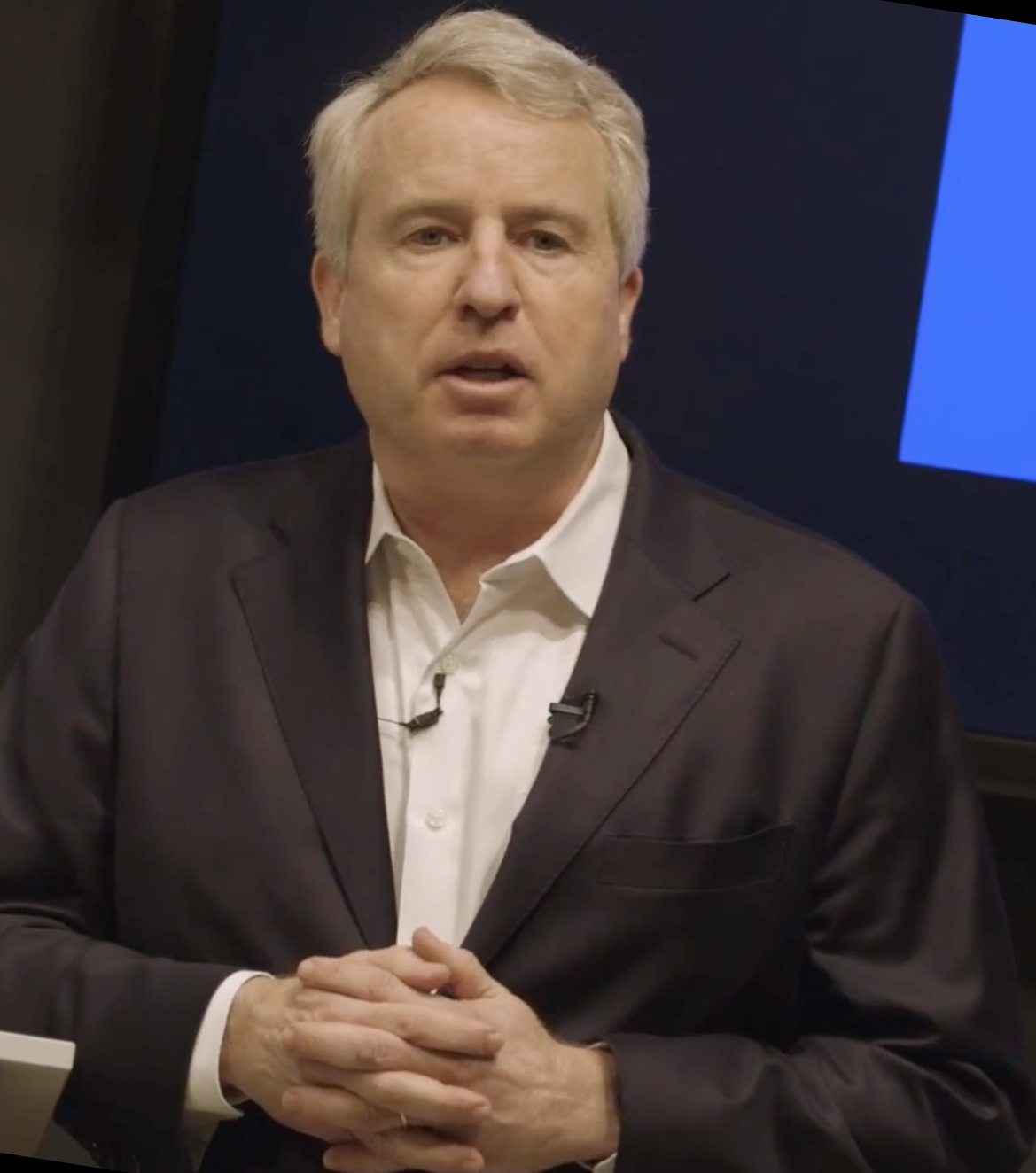
- Kennedy in 2018
- Born: Christopher George Kennedy; July 4, 1963 (age 63); Boston, Massachusetts, U.S.
- Education: Boston College (BA); Northwestern University (MBA)
- Political party: Democratic
- Spouse: Sheila Berner (m. 1987)
- Children: 4
- Parent(s): Robert F. Kennedy; Ethel Skakel
- Relatives: Kennedy family

Signature
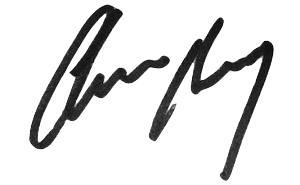

Christopher George Kennedy (born July 4, 1963) is an American businessman who is the chair of Joseph P. Kennedy Enterprises, Inc. A member of the prominent Kennedy family, he is a son of former United States Senator Robert F. Kennedy and Ethel Kennedy, and a nephew of former U.S. President John F. Kennedy and former U.S. Senator Ted Kennedy. From 2000 until 2012, he was also president of Merchandise Mart Properties, a commercial property management firm based in Chicago.

He was a candidate in the Democratic Party primary for Governor of Illinois in the 2018 election. He was appointed by Governor Pat Quinn as Chair of the Board of Trustees for the University of Illinois and served from 2009 to 2015.

== Early life and education ==
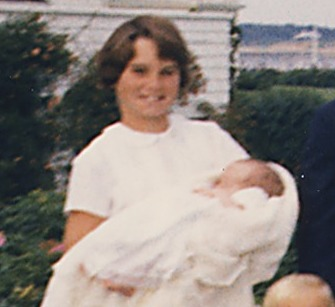
Chris, 30 days old, being held by his sister Kathleen

Kennedy was born on July 4, 1963, in Boston, Massachusetts on his eldest sister Kathleen's twelfth birthday, to Robert F. Kennedy and Ethel Kennedy (née Skakel), the eighth of their eleven children. He is one of four grandchildren of George Skakel, Joseph P. Kennedy Sr. and Rose Fitzgerald Kennedy born during the administration of his uncle U.S. President John F. Kennedy.

He grew up at his family home, Hickory Hill, in McLean, Virginia, a suburb of Washington, D.C., and attended the Lady of Victory Catholic School in McLean through the eighth grade. He transferred to Georgetown Preparatory School in North Bethesda, Maryland, also a suburb of Washington, and graduated in 1982. While in high school, he volunteered at a home for runaway youth.

Kennedy graduated from Boston College with a Bachelor of Arts degree in political science in 1986. In 1992, he graduated with a Master of Business Administration degree from the Kellogg School of Management at Northwestern University.

== Career ==
Kennedy is chairman of the Kennedy family investment firm Joseph P. Kennedy Enterprises, Inc. He is treasurer of the Joseph P. Kennedy Jr. Foundation, he was on the Executive Committee for the Chicago Community Trust, and he has been a board member of the Catholic Theological Union, Interface, Inc. and Knoll Inc. He is a member of the mutual fund board of trustees for Ariel Investments.

Kennedy moved from Boston to Decatur to work for Archer Daniels Midland in the 1980s, and has spent his life working around issues of hunger, whether as the chairman of the Greater Chicago Food Depository, or now helping to run the non-profit he and his wife founded, Top Box Foods.

Kennedy was the president of Merchandise Mart Properties in Chicago, Illinois, from 2000 until 2012. The property was originally owned by the Kennedy family until it was sold to Vornado Realty Trust, a real estate investment trust. The Merchandise Mart, one of the properties of Merchandise Mart Properties, is the largest commercial building in the world, serving as both a luxury wholesale design center and one of the leading international business locations in Chicago. The Mart spans two city blocks and rises twenty-five stories for a total of 4.2 million square feet (390,000 square metres) Three million people come through the Mart each year to visit its retail shops, permanent showrooms, and office space as well as attend the numerous trade, consumer and community events hosted there.

Kennedy also served as Chairman of the Board of Trustees at the University of Illinois. His gubernatorial appointment concluded in 2015. In 2015, Kennedy won the Simon Wiesenthal Center's Spirit of Courage award for his involvement in the controversy.

Kennedy has partnered with CIP (the International Potato Center) and 2Blades in the fight against Phytophthora infestans in Africa, the same blight which brought some of his ancestors to the United States. He is chairing the 2Blades African Potato Initiative which is developing and producing the seed potatoes to be sold in Uganda and Kenya.

=== Top Box Foods ===
In May 2012, Kennedy started the Chicago-based non-profit Top Box Foods. Top Box Foods is an anti-hunger not-for-profit community-based social business that sells high-quality groceries at affordable costs in Chicago and its suburbs.

Top Box as an organization purchases food, boxes it in various combinations and delivers it monthly to churches and organizations in mostly low-income neighborhoods. The food items in the box change from month to month and include a wide variety of fruits, vegetables, meats, and frozen meals, with box prices ranging from $19 to $39. The boxes can be ordered online or through the organizations where the boxes are delivered. These organizations, otherwise known as Top Box "host sites," range from small neighborhood churches with a few dozen families to some of the Chicago's largest, including Trinity United Church of Christ and Salem Baptist Church. Top Box has locations in Illinois in Chicago, Cook County, and Rockford, in Louisiana in New Orleans and Baton Rouge, and in Atlanta, Georgia.

== Personal life ==
Kennedy met Sheila Sinclair Berner (born December 4, 1962), an Illinois native and daughter of Sheila Reynolds and attorney Robert Berner, while both were attending Boston College. Sheila's maternal aunt, Anne Reynolds Skakel, had been married to Kennedy's maternal uncle, Rushton Skakel, until her death, making Michael Skakel a first cousin to them both. Through another maternal aunt, Sheila is a first cousin to Jenny Sanford. After graduating from college in 1986, Kennedy moved to Decatur, Illinois, and married Sheila in 1987. The couple has four children, Katherine Berner Kennedy (b. 1990), Christopher George Kennedy Jr. (b. 1992) m. Erin Daigle, Sarah Louise Kennedy (b. 1994) m. Jam Sulahry, and Clare Elizabeth Kennedy (b. 1998), whom they raised in the Chicago suburb of Kenilworth. His wife earned a J.D. degree from Northwestern University and practiced at Sidley & Austin in Chicago before taking time off to take care of their children.

== Political career ==
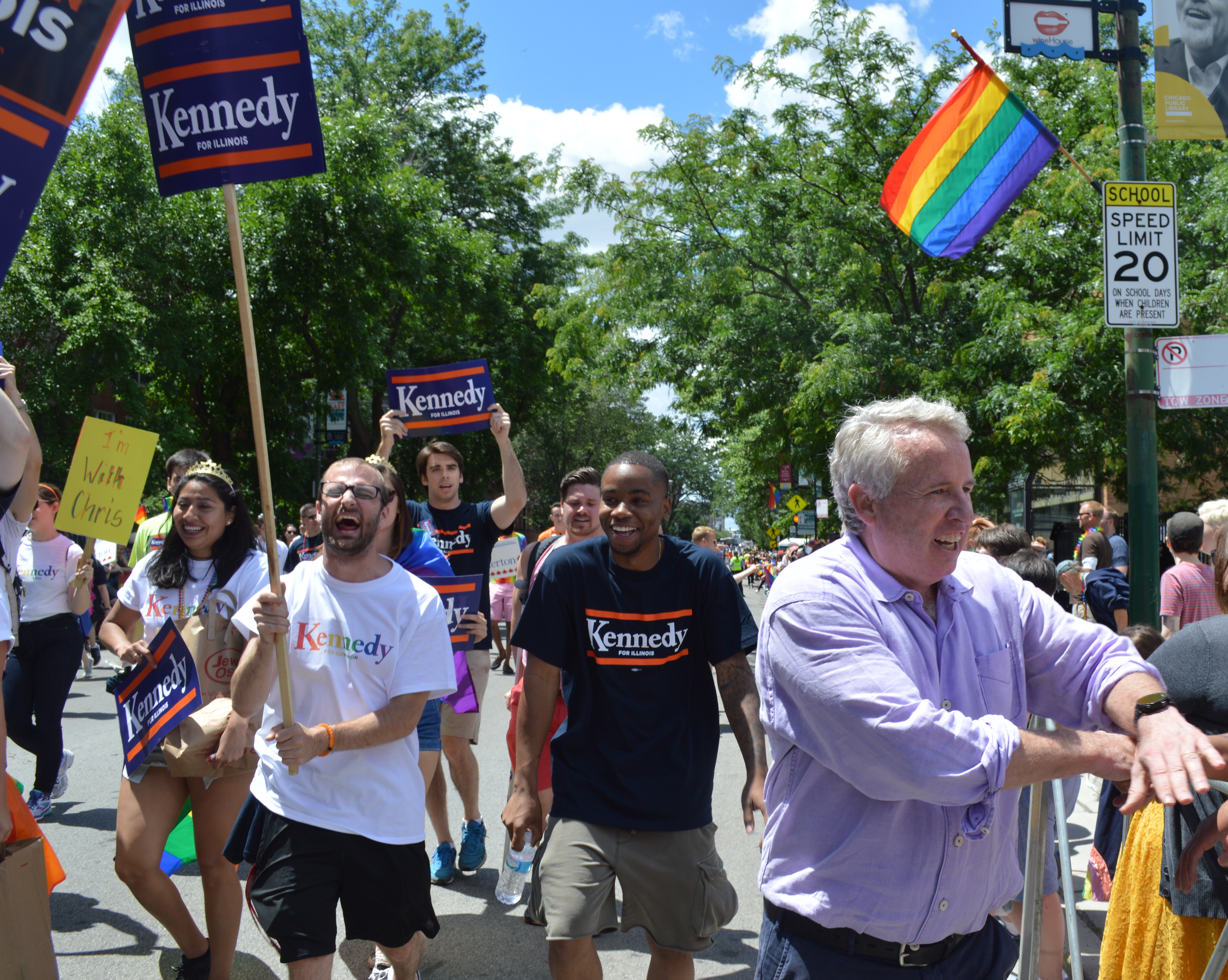
Kennedy attending Chicago's Pride Parade.

Kennedy's political activism began at an early age, and in 1979 and 1980 he worked on his uncle U.S. Senator Ted Kennedy's bid for the 1980 Democratic Party's nomination for U.S. President. He was also treasurer of the campaign committee for his brother Joe's reelection to the U.S. House in 1988. Over the years he has organized numerous fundraising events in Chicago for his uncle Ted, his sister Kathleen, his brother Joe and his cousin Mark Kennedy Shriver.

The National Journal once quoted Kennedy as saying, "I have a lot to keep up with: a brother who might run for Congress, a sister and a brother considering races for governor, a cousin who might run for Congress, another in Congress, an uncle in the Senate and a cousin-in-law, Arnold [Schwarzenegger], who is thinking of running for governor."

Beyond his family, Kennedy has served in a variety of capacities for numerous political campaigns, including hosting a fundraiser for Barack Obama in his bid for U.S. Senate. In the Democratic primary of the 2002 Illinois gubernatorial election, Kennedy served as the general chairman of Paul Vallas' campaign.

In August 2009, after considering a run for the U.S. Senate, as did many others, Kennedy decided not to run. Also in August 2009, on the day after his uncle Ted's death on August 25, 2009, Kennedy was appointed to the University of Illinois board of trustees by Democratic Illinois Governor Pat Quinn. On September 10, 2009, Kennedy was elected by the trustees as their chairman.

Prior to February 8, 2017, when Kennedy announced his candidacy for the Democratic Nomination for Illinois Governor in 2018, he had never run for any elective office.

Kennedy during his campaign for governor advocated for "a property tax system that can't be abused by the wealthy and insiders" in a fundraising email. Kennedy criticized one of his fellow Democratic gubernatorial candidates, J.B. Pritzker, for getting a large property tax reduction on a Gold Coast mansion. "It's an inherently corruptible system and we ought to reject it," Kennedy said to reporters in reference to Pritzker's property taxes. "The Cook County property tax appeals business is notorious for pricing political connections at a premium," wrote the Illinois Policy Institute, a conservative website. Kennedy has further gone on to state that what Mike Madigan is doing, referring to his conflict of interest from serving as the house speaker while working as a property tax attorney, should be illegal. When Kennedy served as the President of Merchandise Mart Properties Inc, the company used Madigan's law firm to win property tax refunds via the appeals process, receiving over $133,000.

In June 2017, Kennedy was endorsed by Congressman Bobby Rush.

Kennedy called for an open primary in the 2018 gubernatorial race, urging the Cook County Democratic party not to throw their weight behind any other candidate, instead allowing for voters to vet all the candidates in the race. The Cook County Democratic Party endorsed Pritzker in August 2017. Kennedy was forced to backtrack after he defended the campaign of Republican Bruce Rauner running ads attacking Pritzker during the Democratic primary saying "Rauner is trying to do what he thinks is best for the state of Illinois" and "his willingness to speak truth to power... is something that I think he should be applauded for."

Kennedy endorsed incumbent Democrat Joe Biden's reelection campaign in the 2024 United States presidential election over a third-party/independent challenge by his brother Robert. After Biden dropped out, Kennedy endorsed Vice President Kamala Harris's campaign, with the siblings denouncing his brother Robert Jr.'s decision to endorse former President Donald Trump, calling the move a "betrayal".

== Business and economic involvement ==
He is on the board of trustees and serves as Chair of the Audit Committee for the mutual funds managed by Ariel Investments, a Chicago-based investment-management firm. He is currently Chairman of the Board and Chair of the Nominating & Governance Committee for Interface, a commercial flooring company focused on creating spaces with a positive and ecological impact on both people and planet. He is also Chair of the Nominating & Governance Committee and serves on the Executive Committee for the Marine Biological Laboratory, an affiliate of the University of Chicago and leading international center for research and education in biological and environmental science located in Woods Hole, MA.

Chris previously served on the Board of Directors of the leading international design and furniture manufacturing firm Knoll.

Chris is the former Finance Chair of the Executive Committee for the Chicago Community Trust.

From 1997 to 1999, Kennedy served as chairman of the Chicago Convention and Tourism Bureau, a sales-and-marketing organization promoting Chicago to the tourism and convention industries. Under Kennedy's chairmanship, the bureau retained and expanded Chicago's event-and-convention industry.

Since 2000, Kennedy has been a member of the City Club of Chicago, a group that brings together civic and cultural leaders to discuss and debate issues affecting the Chicago area.

Since 2005, he has been a member of the Commercial Club of Chicago, a group that brings together the city's business, educational, and cultural leaders on projects to improve central industries and create new economic opportunities.

== Other civic involvement ==
- Since 1996, he has been a member of the Chicago Council on Global Affairs, a nonpartisan group that seeks to impact discourse on global issues through leadership, education, and policy.
- Since 1996, Kennedy has been on the board of directors at The Irish Fellowship Club, a Chicago-based group dedicated to preserving and promoting Irish heritage.
- From 2006 until the Spring of 2013, he served on the board of directors of Catholic Theological Union, the largest Roman Catholic graduate school of theology and ministry in the U.S.
- Greater Chicago Food Depository is a nonprofit food distribution and training center providing food for hungry people while striving to end hunger throughout Cook County, Illinois. It also offers education programs providing the knowledge and tools needed to break the poverty cycle.
- El Valor is a nonprofit group seeking to enrich the local community by empowering the underserved, disenfranchised, and disabled while creating a sense of unity among all community members.
- Heartland Alliance is a human-rights-advocacy group providing housing, healthcare, economic security, and legal protection for low-income citizens.
- Governor Pat Quinn appointed Kennedy to the board of trustees of the University of Illinois in September 2009. He served in that role until his gubernatorial appointment expired in January 2015.
- He served as a Member of the Executive Committee of the Chicago Community Trust until January 2015.
- He served as the Lund-Gill Chair in the Rosary College of Arts and Sciences at Dominican University (Illinois).

== Residential development ==
As Chairman of Joseph P. Kennedy Enterprises, Inc., Kennedy is responsible for the development of the Kennedy family real estate holdings in Chicago known as Wolf Point, Chicago. The Wolf Point development site represents a billion-dollar commitment to the downtown core, and the site is zoned for construction of a residential apartment building, a self-park garage, and two additional high-rise buildings.

Kennedy also is a partner in Sudbury Station LLC, a development entity proposing a 250-unit luxury rental housing development with a state mandated minimum affordable housing set aside in Sudbury, Massachusetts, designed to meet local housing needs for seniors and the working class community. Proposed on a 39-acre parcel zoned residential near the Historic District of Sudbury, the Village at Sudbury Station would satisfy the Massachusetts affordable housing mandate for Sudbury, would be located close to schools, parks, churches and public safety facilities, and would contribute significant additional tax revenue to the town. The project has received criticism from town officials and residents. Residents voted unanimously to hire a special counsel to stop the development, which they allege violates over thirty local zoning ordinances.

== See also ==
- Kennedy Curse
- Kennedy family
