= USCGC Angela McShan =

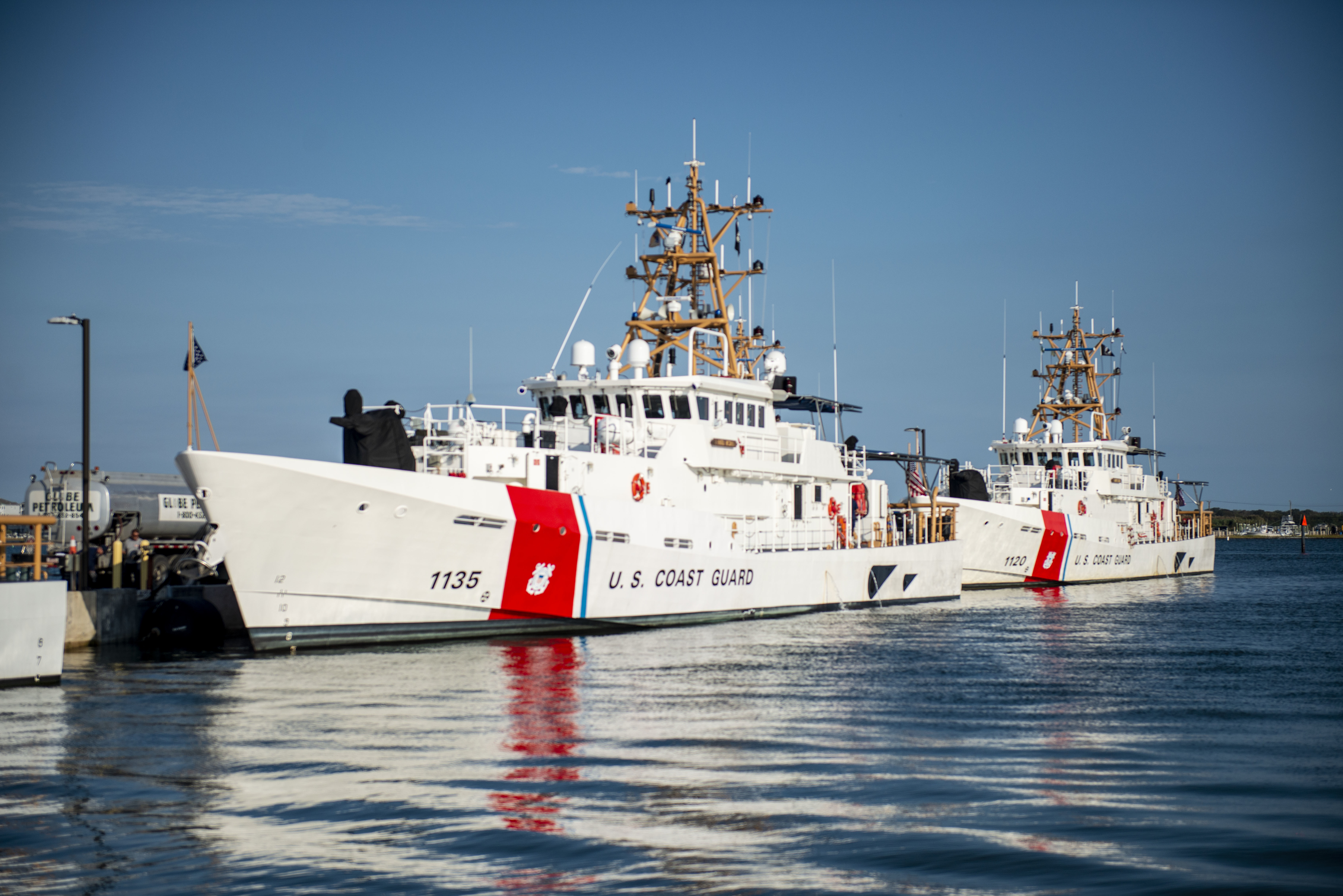
- Angela McShan in Cape May, September 28, 2019

History

United States
- Name: Angela McShan
- Namesake: Angela McShan
- Operator: United States Coast Guard
- Builder: Bollinger Shipyards, Lockport, Louisiana
- Acquired: August 1, 2019
- Commissioned: October 26, 2019
- Home port: Cape May, New Jersey
- Identification: Hull number: WPC-1135
- Motto: We Reach High
- Status: in active service
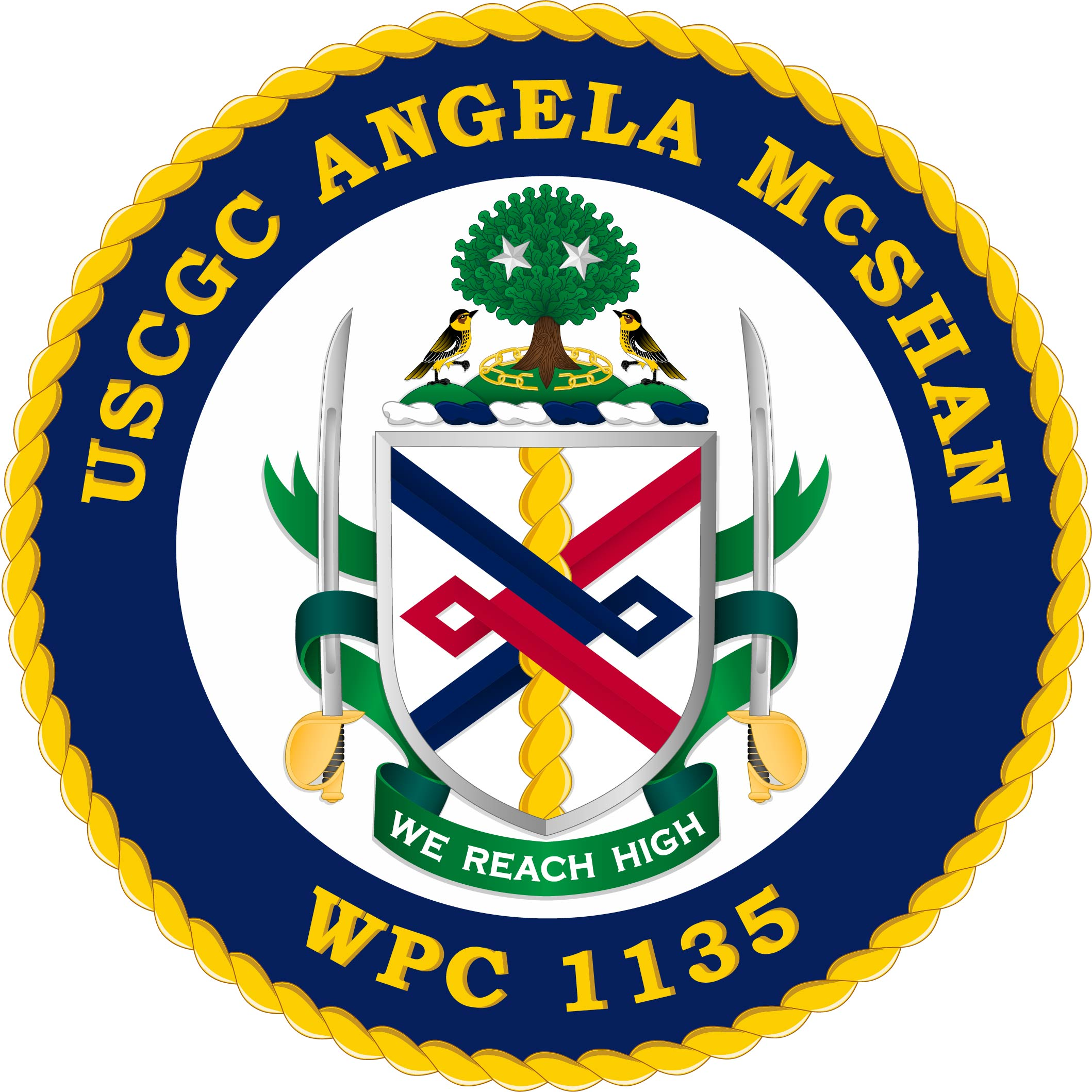
- Badge

General characteristics
- Class & type: Sentinel-class cutter
- Displacement: 353 long tons (359 t)
- Length: 46.8 m (154 ft)
- Beam: 8.11 m (26.6 ft)
- Depth: 2.9 m (9.5 ft)
- Propulsion: 2 × 4,300 kW (5,800 shp); 1 × 75 kW (101 shp) bow thruster
- Speed: 28 knots (52 km/h; 32 mph)
- Range: 2,500 nautical miles (4,600 km; 2,900 mi)
- Endurance: 5 days
- Boats & landing craft carried: 1 × Cutter Boat - Over the Horizon Interceptor
- Complement: 4 officers, 20 crew
- Sensors & processing systems: L-3 C4ISR suite
- Armament: 1 × Mk 38 Mod 2 25 mm automatic gun; 4 × crew-served Browning M2 machine guns
- Notes: First Commanding Officer LT Brian Field

USCGC Angela McShan (WPC-1135) is the United States Coast Guard's 35th Sentinel-class cutter.

Like her sister ships she was built in the Bollinger Shipyards, in Lockport, Louisiana.

== Design ==
Like her sister ships, Angela McShan is designed to perform search and rescue missions, port security, and the interception of smugglers. She is armed with a remotely-controlled, gyro-stabilized 25 mm autocannon, four crew served M2 Browning machine guns, and light arms. She is equipped with a stern launching ramp, that allows her to launch or retrieve a water-jet propelled high-speed auxiliary boat, without first coming to a stop. Her high-speed boat has over-the-horizon capability, and is useful for inspecting other vessels, and deploying boarding parties.

The crew's drinking water needs are met through a desalination unit. The crew mess is equipped with a television with satellite reception.

== Operational career ==
The vessel was delivered to the Coast Guard base in Key West for her acceptance trials on August 1, 2019. She was commissioned in her home port of Cape May, New Jersey, in October 2019.

In April 2020, two canoeists went missing 10 miles south of Annapolis, near Herring Bay. They were Maeve McKean and Gideon Joseph Kennedy McKean, the daughter and grandson of Kathleen Kennedy Townsend of the Kennedy clan. The Angela McShan was dispatched to help search for the missing boaters.

== Namesake ==
In 2010, Charles "Skip" W. Bowen, who was then the United States Coast Guard's most senior non-commissioned officer, proposed that all 58 cutters in the Sentinel class should be named after enlisted sailors in the Coast Guard, or one of its precursor services, who were recognized for their heroism. The Coast Guard chose Angela McShan, their first African-American woman to be promoted to Master Chief Petty Officer to be the ship's namesake.
