= Liddy Holloway =

New Zealand actress and TV scriptwriter

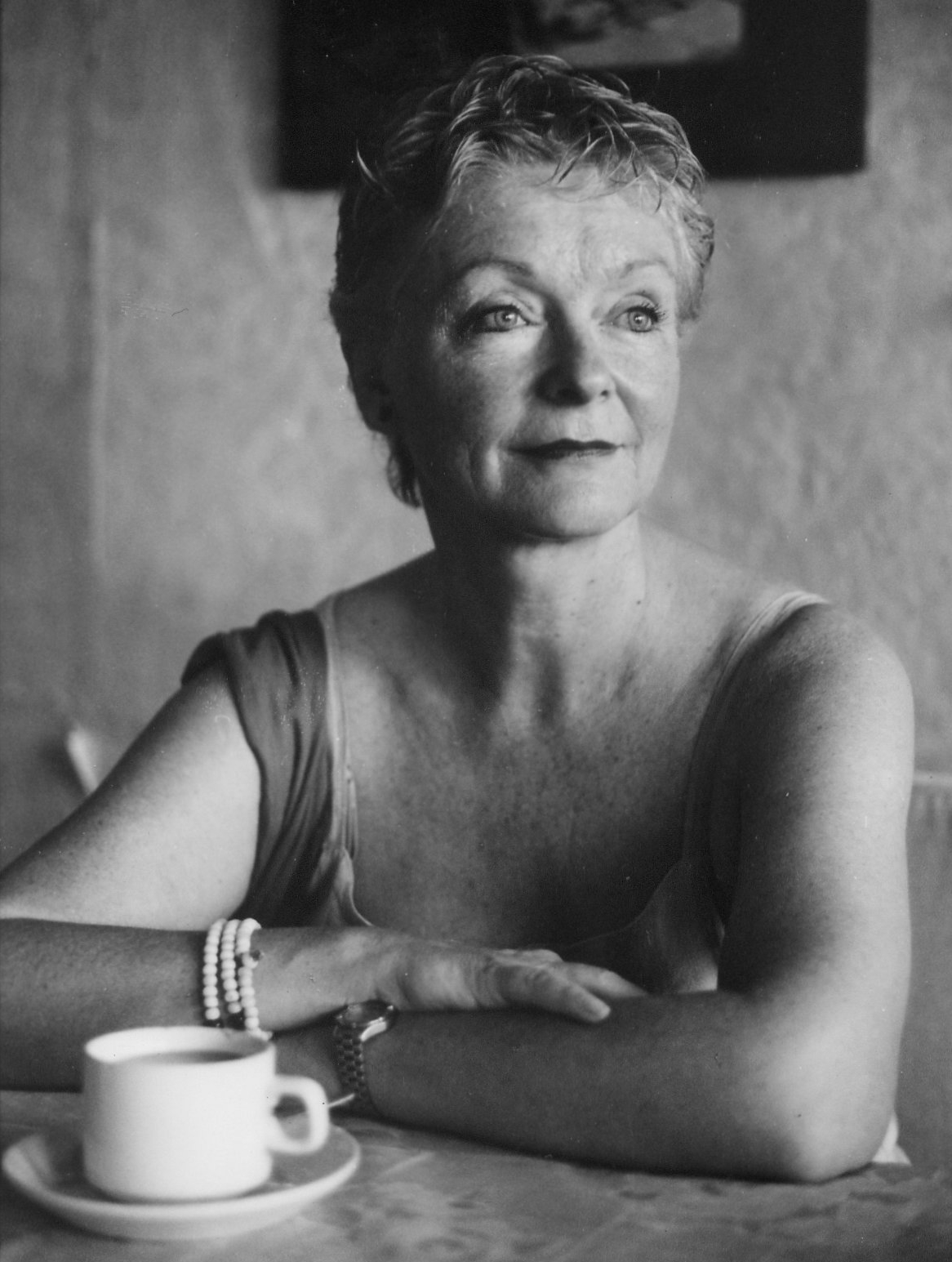
- Born: Elizabeth Brenda Holloway; 27 March 1947; Wellington, New Zealand
- Died: 29 December 2004 (aged 57); Auckland, New Zealand
- Occupation: Actress
- Children: 3, including Joel Tobeck
- Relatives: Phil Holloway (father)

Elizabeth Brenda "Liddy" Holloway (27 March 1947 – 29 December 2004) was a New Zealand actress and television scriptwriter.

== Career ==
Born in Wellington, New Zealand, the daughter of a politician, Phil Holloway, Liddy Holloway originally worked as a journalist. She switched to acting and had a long career in the theatre. She also acted in Australia in the early 1980s, with acting roles in feature films Squizzy Taylor and The Clinic. She also acted on Australian television, appearing in guest roles in several episodes of soap opera Prisoner, a series for which she also wrote some scripts.

Holloway moved to Los Angeles briefly in 1990 to give Hollywood a try, but did not stay long. She eventually garnered international attention for her recurring role as Hercules' mother Alcmene on the syndicated adventure series, Hercules: The Legendary Journeys, a role she played intermittently from 1995 to 1998.

Holloway also found wide recognition in her home country through her 1992–1998 lead role of Alex McKenna in the popular soap opera Shortland Street. Holloway was also a writer for the series, and for other television series such as Shark in the Park.

Holloway was the first person to champion making the book The Whale Rider into a feature film. She had a legal dispute with the New Zealand Film Commission because she wanted a writing credit for her work on the 2002 film adaptation.

In 2002 Holloway portrayed Dorthy Moxley, mother of murder victim Martha Moxley, in the American television movie Murder in Greenwich, which, although set in Connecticut, was filmed in New Zealand.

== Death ==
On 29 December 2004, Liddy Holloway died, aged 57, from liver cancer. She was survived by three children, Francesca Holibar, Mark Harlen, and actor/musician Joel Tobeck, who appeared with her on Shortland Street.

== Filmography ==
=== Film ===
Year	Title	Role	Notes
1982	Squizzy Taylor	Dance Teacher	
1982	The Clinic		
1986	Queen City Rocker	Stacy's Mother	
2000	Jubilee	Mrs. Crawford	
2001	Her Majesty	Virginia Hobson	
2003	Sylvia	Martha Bergstrom	
2004	Fracture	Gwen Peet	
2004	Without a Paddle	Bonnie Newwood	

=== Television ===
Year	Title	Role	Notes
1978	Gather Your Dreams	Secretary	Episodes: "1.1", "1.12", "1.13"
1979	Skyways	Charol	Episode: "Takeover Bid"
1981	Prisoner	Sister Haines	Episodes: "1.177", "1.178"
1982	Loose Enz	Helen	Episode: "Eros and Psyche"
1983–84	Prisoner	Sister Kelly	Recurring role
1984	Special Squad	Mrs. Tait	Episode: "Trojan Horses"
1985	Hanlon	Ruby Hudson	Episode: "In Defence of Minnie Dean"
1987	The Marching Girls	Naomi	Regular role
1991	Shark in the Park	Nicola Porteous	Episode: "Et Tu, Brute"
1992–1998, 2002	Shortland Street	Alex McKenna	Regular role
1992	Homeward Bound	Janine Johnstone	TV series
1995–1998	Hercules: The Legendary Journeys	Alcmene	Recurring role (seasons 2–4)
1999	Duggan	Zelda	Episode: "Workshop for Murder"
2000	Murder Call	Delia Frampton	Episode: "Paid in Full"
2002	Murder in Greenwich	Dorothy Moxley	TV film
2003	Lucy	Mildred	TV film
