= Max Kennedy Jr. =

American government volunteer, political organizer, and member of the Kennedy family

- Born: Matthew Maxwell Taylor Kennedy Jr. September 18, 1993 (age 33)
- Education: Harvard University (BA); Stanford University (JD)
- Occupation: Political organizer
- Political party: Democratic
- Father: Max Kennedy
- Family: Kennedy family

Matthew Maxwell Taylor Kennedy Jr. (born September 18, 1993) is an American government volunteer, political organizer, and member of the Kennedy family. He is the whistleblower who sent a complaint to the United States House Committee on Oversight and Reform regarding the White House Coronavirus Task Force, which he worked on as a volunteer. Kennedy worked for the Democratic Party on their 2020 campaign efforts.

== Biography ==
Kennedy was born on September 18, 1993, to Victoria Anne Strauss and Max Kennedy. He is a grandson of Robert F. Kennedy and Ethel Kennedy. Kennedy grew up in Hyannis Port, Massachusetts, near the Kennedy Compound. As a teenager he volunteered with Riverkeeper. He graduated from Harvard University in 2016. After graduating, he did part time work at consulting and investment firms and had planned to take the LSAT in March 2020 and apply to law schools, until the onset of the COVID-19 pandemic. A lifelong Democrat, Kennedy felt torn about volunteering to work in the Trump Administration, but decided the job "didn't seem political." He joined the White House Coronavirus Task Force's Supply-Chain Task Force, led by President Donald Trump's son-in-law, Jared Kushner, that formed to provide protective equipment to places where outbreaks of the virus had occurred.

On his first day as a task force volunteer, Kennedy arrived at the Federal Emergency Management Agency headquarters and joined a team of a dozen volunteers, all in their twenties. Kennedy, who took the position with the intention of being support staff for the task force, told The New Yorker that he and the other volunteers were the official task force team for the U.S. Federal Government. He and other volunteers were responsible for obtaining medical supplies using their own personal computers and private email accounts. Kennedy was pressured by Brad Smith, an appointee directing the task force, to create a model with false information on the projected number of coronavirus fatalities in the United States. Kennedy declined to perform the assignment. Kennedy stated that the task force was instructed to prioritize requests from the President's supporters and friends, including Jeanine Pirro. They were also instructed to direct millions of dollars' worth of medical supplies to five pre-selected distributors. In April 2020, despite having signed a nondisclosure agreement, he sent an anonymous complaint to the United States House Committee on Oversight and Reform detailing failures and "dangerous incompetence" in the Trump Administration's response to the pandemic. Kennedy referred to the Trump Administration's coronavirus response as "family office meets organized crime, melded with Lord of the Flies" and called it "a government of chaos." He quit the task force later that month and now works for the Democratic Party, and helped on the Joe Biden 2020 presidential campaign.

Kennedy is featured in Alex Gibney's 2020 documentary Totally Under Control.
