= Maeve McKean =

American attorney and health official (1979–2020)

- Born: Maeve Fahey Kennedy Townsend; November 1, 1979; New Haven, Connecticut, U.S.
- Died: April 2, 2020 (aged 40); Chesapeake Bay, near Maryland, U.S.
- Education: Boston College (BA); Georgetown University (MS, JD)
- Political party: Democratic
- Spouse: David McKean (m. 2009)
- Children: 3
- Parent(s): David Townsend; Kathleen Kennedy
- Relatives: Kennedy family

Maeve Fahey Kennedy McKean (née Townsend; November 1, 1979 – April 2, 2020) was an American public health official, human rights attorney, and academic. A member of the Kennedy family, she was a daughter of Maryland Lieutenant Governor Kathleen Kennedy Townsend and a granddaughter of U.S. Attorney General Robert F. Kennedy.

McKean served as the executive director of the Global Health Initiative at Georgetown University. During the Obama administration, McKean was the first-ever Senior Advisor for Human Rights in the United States Department of State's global AIDS program and the Office of Global Affairs at the U.S. Department of Health and Human Services. McKean disappeared while canoeing in the Chesapeake Bay in 2020. Her body was recovered from the Chesapeake later that week.

== Early life and education ==
McKean was a daughter of Kathleen Kennedy Townsend, the former Lieutenant Governor of Maryland, and David Lee Townsend, a professor at St. John's College. She was born in New Haven, Connecticut on November 1, 1979, and was raised in the Roman Catholic faith. A member of the Kennedy family, she was a granddaughter of Robert F. Kennedy and Ethel Kennedy and a great-niece of President John F. Kennedy and First Lady Jacqueline Bouvier Kennedy.

McKean attended elementary and middle schools in the Baltimore County Public Schools system, and later attended St. Paul's School for Girls for high school, graduating in 1997. She was an undergraduate student at Boston College. While in college, she worked part-time at Bruegger's and Dunkin' Donuts and studied abroad at Trinity College Dublin in Ireland. She graduated from Georgetown University with a joint juris doctor degree from Georgetown University Law Center and a Master of Science in Foreign Service degree in international negotiations and conflict resolution from the Walsh School of Foreign Service in 2009.

== Career ==
McKean was a volunteer in the Peace Corps in Mozambique. She returned to the United States in 2002 to work on her mother's unsuccessful gubernatorial campaign. She served in the Obama administration as the first-ever Senior Advisor for Human Rights within the United States Department of State's Global AIDS program and at the U.S. Department of Health and Human Services' Office of Global Affairs, where she led teams on working with human rights policy issues, women's and children's health, and LGBTQ health.

She also worked for U.S. Senator Dianne Feinstein in California and in Washington, D.C.

McKean served as an associate research professor at the CUNY Graduate School of Public Health and Health Policy and co-launched the university's Center for Immigrant, Refugee and Global Health. She served as the executive director of Georgetown University's Global Health Initiative. McKean was also an adjunct professor at Georgetown, where she taught bioethics and human rights.

In March 2019 McKean, during an interview with Spanish news agency EFE, stated that her public health work is centered on women and children because they are "half of the world" and due to more funding and research going in to drugs and interventions that pertain to health issues related to men. On May 8, 2019, she spoke out against her uncle, Robert F. Kennedy, Jr., and his non-profit health organization, Children's Health Defense, for spreading false information about vaccines. In March 2020 she signed a letter, along with hundreds of other public health officials, urging U.S. Vice President Mike Pence to follow scientific recommendations and provide adequate funding in response to COVID-19.

== Personal life ==
McKean met David McKean, then a student at the University of California at Berkeley, while she was working in California for Senator Feinstein in 2003. The two went on a trip to Asia together, travelling to China, Cambodia, Vietnam, Thailand, and Laos. They became engaged in 2008. They married on March 21, 2009, at the Whittemore House, a mansion in Washington, D.C. that serves as the headquarters of the Woman's National Democratic Club. They had three children. The family lived in Washington, D.C., where both McKean and her husband worked as lawyers. She served as president of the Parent–Teacher Association at Capitol Hill Cluster School, a public K-8 school where her children are enrolled.

== Disappearance and death ==
On April 2, 2020, McKean and her eight-year-old son, Gideon Joseph Kennedy McKean, disappeared while paddling in a canoe near McKean's mother's waterfront residence in Shady Side, Maryland.

McKean had taken her family to Maryland to stay in quarantine during the COVID-19 pandemic. Reports from the Maryland Natural Resources Police say they were attempting to retrieve a kickball that had landed in the water. Due to high winds, they were swept further out into the Chesapeake Bay. Fire officials from Anne Arundel County received an emergency call at 4:30 pm that day from a man who reported seeing a woman and her son, presumably the McKeans, in a small canoe near the community pier at Columbia Beach.

McKean and her son were last sighted ten miles south of Annapolis, near Herring Bay. Marine units from the Queen Anne's County Police Department, Anne Arundel County Police Department, Maryland State Police, and the Maryland Department of Natural Resources, as well as the United States Coast Guard, searched the Chesapeake by boat and helicopter. Natural Resources Police reported that an overturned canoe was found around 7:00 pm on April 3, 2020, near Rockhold Creek in Deale Later that night, after twenty-six hours, the Coast Guard suspended its search. At 7:30 pm, Maryland officials called off the search due to darkness. As of April 3, 2020, she and her son were presumed dead. On April 4, 2020, the search was resumed by Maryland police.

Maeve McKean's body was recovered on April 6, 2020, and her son's body was recovered two days later. On April 8, 2020, the medical examiner reported McKean accidentally drowned in the turbulent and chilly water of the Chesapeake Bay.

Due to the coronavirus pandemic, a public funeral could not take place. An online memorial via Zoom, called A Gathering of Love and Thanksgiving for Maeve and Gideon, was hosted by the Kennedy family on April 11, 2020, and watched by over 3,000 people. Melissa Etheridge, Natasha Bedingfield, and Kenny Chesney performed at the online memorial. Maeve McKean and her son Gideon were cremated, and their ashes were scattered off the coast of Martha's Vineyard in Massachusetts. A memorial website was later established in their memory.

== See also ==
- Kennedy family
- Kennedy curse
