= Mickey Sherman =

American lawyer

- Born: Michael Sherman circa 1947 (age 78–79)
- Occupation: Lawyer
- Spouse(s): Judy Jacobson (????–2005); Lis Wiehl (2006–2012)
- Children: 2

Michael "Mickey" Sherman (born circa 1947) is a Connecticut-based American criminal defense attorney. He is known for his representation of Michael Skakel. Sherman's client was found guilty. In October 2013, a judge ordered a retrial for Skakel, citing Sherman's "glaring ineffectiveness"; the State appealed to the Connecticut Supreme Court, which reinstated the conviction on December 30, 2016, as reported by the New York Times on December 31, 2016. On May, 4, 2018, the conviction was overturned by the Connecticut Supreme Court.

On March 15, 2011, Sherman was sent to prison for failing to pay more than $1.1 million in federal taxes. Sherman was released from prison in December 2011 and returned to the active practice of law in 2012.

== Early life and education ==
Sherman grew up in a section of Greenwich, Connecticut that was not affluent. A graduate of Greenwich High School, Sherman received his bachelor's degree from the University of Connecticut and, in 1971, his Juris Doctor from the University of Connecticut School of Law. In May 2005, Sherman was disinvited from speaking at Greenwich High School's commencement due to public outcry from parents. Jackie Striano, Greenwich High School activities director, said Sherman was disinvited because he had defended several students from the school against drunk-driving charges over the years.

== Career ==
Sherman was disciplined by a state licensing authority in both 2007 and 2011. In 2011, Sherman was suspended from practicing as a lawyer.

Mr. Sherman served as an assistant public Defender in Stamford Superior Court and later as an assistant prosecutor, a post he held for four years.

His courtroom and trial tactics have been the subject of feature articles in the New York Times, the National Law Journal, The American Lawyer, and New York Newsday. In 1986, the New York Times questioned whether he hurt the jury system by hiring a juror from a deadlocked rape jury to sit through the defendant's retrial as a consultant. After the second trial, the Connecticut Legislature passed a statute outlawing the tactic.

Sherman has been employed as a "legal analyst" by CBS News, for which he appeared on the CBS Early Show and CBS Evening News.

Sherman defended a Vietnam veteran in a murder trial using a post-traumatic stress disorder defense. That became the subject of half-hour productions on CBS's Verdict, NBC's Dateline and the BBC series, America on Trial.

In Barry Levinson's 2006 film Man of the Year, Sherman appears as a talking head.

== Criminal conviction ==
Sherman pleaded guilty in 2010 to failing to pay two years' worth of federal income taxes, more than $420,000, and starting on March 15, 2011, served a year and a day in a minimum-security prison camp in upstate New York.

== Billing practices and misconduct ==
On January 5, 2007, the Hartford Courant reported that Sherman was under investigation by a panel of the Statewide Grievance Committee, a state agency which disciplines lawyers, concerning an accusation that he violated several rules of professional conduct, including charging the client $187,000 without providing a fee agreement or an hourly billing statement. A former client, Hakan Yalincak, complained to the agency in March 2006 that Sherman, his attorney, had billed him $187,000, bounced a refund check, and had provided little documentation to show where the money went.

In 2006, Sherman paid Yalincak a $50,000 refund during the grievance process, and the former client tried to drop his charges, but the agency wouldn't allow it. The panel then started investigating whether or not Sherman had acted improperly by making a payment to someone who brought accusations against him to the state agency. Sherman said the payment had nothing to do with the complaint to the agency but was made in exchange for Yalincak's agreement not to file a lawsuit against him. In September 2006, a regional panel of the Statewide Grievance Committee issued a finding of probable cause against Sherman. In February 2007, Yalincak also filed a federal lawsuit against Sherman and his partners at the law firm of Sherman, Richichi, & Hickey, LLC. In May 2007, Sherman agreed to reduced charges that he violated two rules of professional conduct and was reprimanded by the Statewide Grievance Committee. In October 2007, Sherman also reached two confidential settlements with the complainant. In early 2009, the Federal Grievance Committee of the United States District Court for the District of Connecticut imposed identical discipline with the Statewide Grievance Committee on Sherman for identical violations.

On April 16, 2006, Sherman was also temporarily suspended for four days for failing to pay the Client Security Fund Fee in accordance with Practice Book 2-70.

On June 30, 2010, Sherman pleaded guilty two counts of willfully failing to pay federal income taxes for tax years 2001 and 2002, in the amount of $390,000 in the United States District Court for the District of Connecticut. As of the date of his plea, Sherman still owed penalties and interest for those years in the approximate amount of $309,000. Sherman also owes back taxes in the approximate amount of $697,500, and approximately $144,000 in penalties and interest, for the 2004 through 2008 tax years. He was sentenced on December 22, 2010 to one year and one day in prison. He reported to prison on March 16, 2011.

Sherman's former law firm partner, the late Joseph Richichi also pleaded guilty to similar charges of tax evasion for failing to pay taxes on approximately $3.1 million on April 5, 2007 and was sentenced on December 19, 2007 to sixteen month imprisonment.

Accounts by the Stamford Advocate in 2011 and 2012, as well as the Connecticut Superior Court website indicate that Sherman was reinstated as an attorney permitted to practice law in the State of Connecticut, provided he submits to monthly audits of his client escrow account and billing practices.

In October 2013, Superior Court Judge Thomas Bishop in Connecticut found that Sherman had rendered ineffective assistance to another former client, Michael C. Skakel, who had been convicted of murdering Martha Moxley in Greenwich, Connecticut. Although Sherman had been paid nearly $1.2 million to defend Skakel, in a 136-page scathing opinion Judge Bishop heavily criticized Sherman's legal representation because Sherman was representing Skakel while trying to placate the IRS, Sherman failed to follow up leads, and was too distracted by the media spotlight and rendered ineffective assistance of counsel to Michael Skakel. In the same 136 page opinion, Judge Bishop vacated Michael C. Skakel's conviction for murder and ordered a new trial. The State of Connecticut appealed, and Skakel was released on bond pending the appeal. On December 30, 2016, the Connecticut Supreme Court overturned this decision, reinstating the murder conviction. After a motion for reconsideration, the court reversed itself on May 4, 2018, vacating Skakel's conviction once again due to what was found to be ineffective representation by Sherman.

== Personal life ==
Sherman divorced Judy Jacobson in 2005 and married Fox News legal analyst and author Lis Wiehl on June 23, 2006 at an Old Greenwich, Connecticut restaurant.

Sherman has two children with ex-wife Judy Jacobson, a son, lawyer Mark Sherman, and a daughter, Jamie. His daughter-in-law is Connecticut lawyer Rachel Sherman, who is married to Mark.

In 2012, Wiehl confirmed on a morning talk show that she and Sherman had separated.
