= Angela McShan =

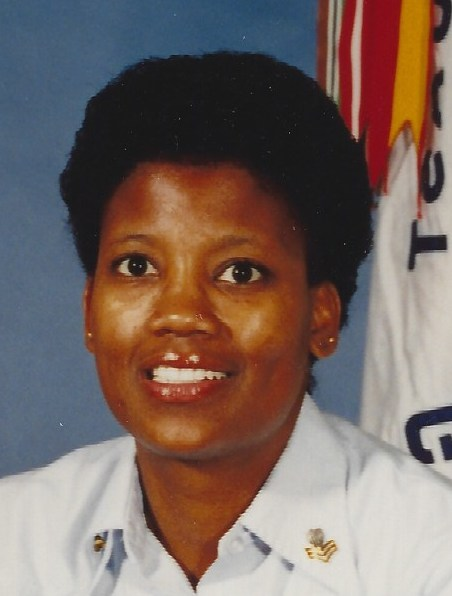
- Born: May 4, 1961; Tuscaloosa, Alabama, US
- Died: December 29, 2000 (aged 39); Newport, Rhode Island, US
- Occupation: Coast Guardsman
- Known for: First African American female Master Chief in USCG

Angela McShan (4 May 1961 – December 29, 2000) was a highly regarded Coast Guardsman in the United States Coast Guard. In 1999 McShan was the first African-American to be appointed an instructor at the Chief Petty Officers' Academy. In 2000 McShan was the Coast Guard's first African-American woman to be advanced to Master Chief Petty Officer.

McShan enlisted in the Coast Guard in July 1979. For her first fourteen years in the Coast Guard she served as a storekeeper. In her final six years McShan served as a yeoman, a civil rights counselor, and finally, an instructor. She was promoted to Master Chief Petty Officer two months before her death in 2000 from cancer.

== Legacy ==
In 2002 the Coast Guard created the YNCM Angela McShan Inspirational Leadership Award in her name.

In 2010, Charles "Skip" W. Bowen, who was then the Coast Guard's most senior non-commissioned officer, proposed that all 58 cutters in the Sentinel class should be named after enlisted sailors in the Coast Guard, or one of its precursor services, who were recognized for their heroism. In 2014 the Coast Guard announced that the 35th cutter would be named the USCGC Angela McShan.

The Angela McShan was commissioned in Cape May, New Jersey, in October, 2019, at a major Coast Guard base where she had served part of her Coast Guard career.
