= Douglas Harriman Kennedy =

American journalist (born 1967)

- Born: March 24, 1967 (age 59); Washington, D.C., U.S.
- Education: Brown University (BA)
- Occupation: Journalist
- Political party: Democratic
- Spouse: Molly Stark (m. 1998)
- Children: 5
- Parent(s): Robert F. Kennedy; Ethel Skakel
- Family: Kennedy

Douglas Harriman Kennedy (born March 24, 1967) is an American journalist. He is the tenth child of Robert F. Kennedy and Ethel Kennedy, named in honor of W. Averell Harriman, a family friend and former governor of New York.

== Life and career ==
Kennedy was born in Washington, D.C., a year before his father's assassination. He married Molly Elizabeth Stark on August 22, 1998, in Nantucket, Massachusetts. They have five children.

Kennedy graduated from Georgetown Preparatory School and Brown University and began his career as a print journalist with The Nantucket Beacon and later the New York Post. As an investigative reporter for the Post, Kennedy obtained the first interview with the officer who arrested Oklahoma City bombing suspect Timothy McVeigh and broke numerous other health care and metropolitan area stories.

He joined Fox News Channel as a general assignment reporter in August 1996 and hosts a bi-weekly program on the network, Douglas Kennedy's American Stories. While at Fox News, he covered the Presidential elections of 1996, 2000, and 2004, as well as Hurricane Katrina.

In 2006, while working as a correspondent for the Fox News show The Big Story, he commented on the controversy over whether the film of "Crocodile Hunter" Steve Irwin's last moments should be shown, noting that he and his siblings "had to grow up with" repeatedly seeing broadcasts and video clips of Kennedy's own father's death. He said that in Irwin's case, it would be really "unnecessary and in very poor taste."

On November 20, 2012, Kennedy was acquitted of misdemeanor physical harassment and child endangerment charges in connection with a January 7, 2012, altercation with two nurses at Northern Westchester Hospital in Mount Kisco, New York, two days after his son, Anthony Boru, was born there. Kennedy attempted to take his infant off the maternity ward for some fresh air, which two nurses said was against hospital policy, and who claimed that he assaulted them when they tried to stop him from doing so. Kennedy was separately investigated by New York child welfare authorities following the incident, but social workers found no signs of child abuse in his home and declared the allegations unfounded in March 2012.

Kennedy and his brother Robert F. Kennedy Jr. offered their support for paroling Sirhan Sirhan, their father's assassin, during Sirhan's appearance before the parole board on August 27, 2021. Sirhan was ultimately denied parole on January 13, 2022 by California Governor Gavin Newsom.

== See also ==
- Kennedy family
