= SGL Carbon =

German manufacturing company

SGL Carbon SE

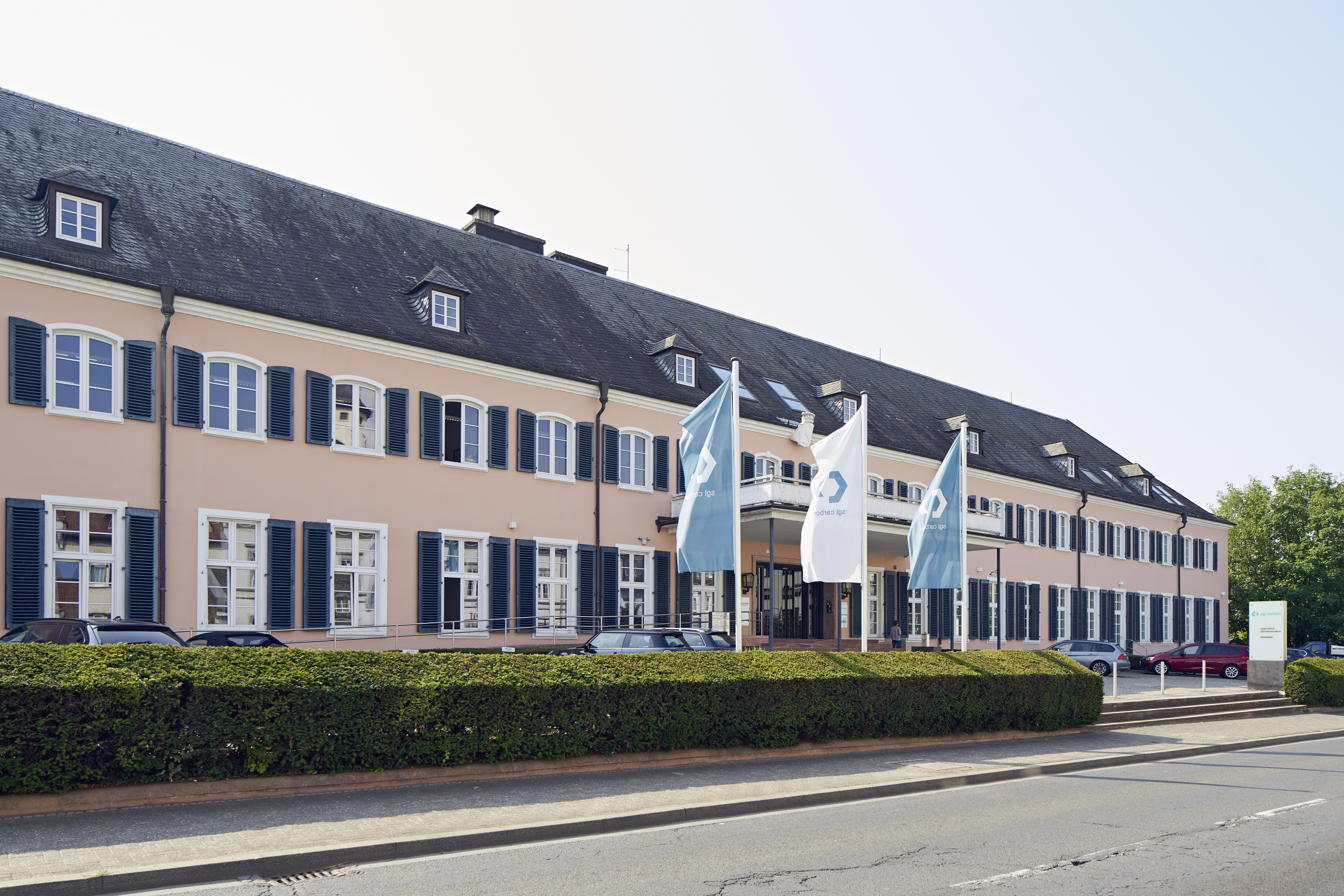
- SGL Carbon headquarters in Wiesbaden, Germany
- Type: Public (Societas Europaea)
- Traded as: FWB: SGL; SDAX
- ISIN: DE0007235301
- Industry: Chemicals
- Founded: 1992
- Headquarters: Wiesbaden, Germany
- Key people: Andreas Klein (CEO); Thomas Dippold (CFO); Stephan Bühler (Member of the Board); Frank Richter (Chairman of the Supervisory Board)
- Products: Graphite specialties, carbon fibres and composites
- Revenue: €850.2 million (2025)
- Number of employees: 3,800 (end 2025)
- Website: www.sglcarbon.com

SGL Carbon SE is a European company based in Germany. It is one of the world's leading manufacturers of products from carbon.

With 29 production sites around the globe (17 in Europe, 8 in North America and 4 in Asia), and a service network in more than 80 countries, SGL Carbon is a globally operating company. The company headquarters is Wiesbaden, Germany.

The SGL share had been included in the German MDAX since 1995, and fell in the smaller SDAX in September 2014. Between March 2020 and March 2021, SGL Carbon has not been a constituent of the SDAX due to the low free float market capitalization. In 2024, the company generated sales revenue of €1.026 billion and employed 4,400 staff worldwide.

== History ==
SGL Carbon AG originated in 1992 from a merger between SIGRI GmbH (Germany) and Great Lakes Carbon (USA) to share a company according to German law. (Note: Some information about the history of Great Lakes Carbon can be found on the Wikipedia page for its founder, George Skakel.)

SIGRI traced back to Gebr. Siemens & Co (Gesco), founded in Berlin as a subsidiary of Siemens AG in 1878. The company originally produced carbon. In 1920, the company set up a plant in Meitingen (Bavaria) and in 1928 merged with Planiawerke AG für Kohlefabrikation in Ratibor (Upper Silesia) to form the new Siemens Planiawerke AG für Kohlefabrikate. After the Second World War, the Meitingen plant of the Siemens Planiawerke AG für Kohlefabrikate merged with Chemische Fabrik Griesheim to form Siemens Plania Chemisches Werk Griesheim, the majority of which was acquired by Hoechst AG in 1953. In 1967, as a result of the merger with electrode manufacturing at Hoechst AG, Siemens Planiawerke AG für Kohlefabrikate also became a majority holding of the chemical company. There it was amalgamated with the Siemens Plania Chemisches Werk Griesheim and other enterprises of Hoechst AG. In 1985, it was renamed SIGRI GmbH and finally Hoechst AG acquired total ownership in 1989.

After the merger with Great Lakes Carbon, Hoechst AG retained a 50 percent stake in the new company. The remaining participation was sold in 1996 as part of the restructuring of the Hoechst Group. Since then, SGL Carbon AG is publicly traded.

In 2014, the company sold the rotor blade manufacturer SGL Rotec, which belongs to the group. In 2015, the US subsidiary "Hitco" was sold at a loss.

In the course of the strategic realignment in 2017, SGL Carbon sold its former core business with graphite electrodes and the business with cathodes, furnace linings and carbon electrodes. At the beginning of 2018, the company sold its shares in the joint venture SGL-Kümpers to the former joint venture partner Kümpers GmbH.

Also in 2018, SGL Carbon acquired the shares in the joint venture Benteler-SGL from Benteler AG and announced the gradual acquisition of BMW Group's shares in the joint venture SGL Automotive Carbon Fibers (ACF).

== Group structure ==
As of October 2022, the company has the following structure:

The function of the Board of Management follows the principle of a management holding which acts as a legally independent entity (SGL Carbon SE).

The operating business is divided into the three business units Graphite Solutions (GS), Process Technology (PT), Fiber Composites (FC).

== Products/applications and markets ==
As of 2021, the mobility market segments (automotive and transport as well as aerospace) represent SGL Carbon's largest market. Industrial applications, which include growing segments such as semiconductors, make up the second-largest market, followed by the energy industry (including batteries as well as wind and solar energy). Further key customers are located in the chemical and textile fibers segments.

The individual business units' products, applications and customer segments are as follows:

=== Graphite Solutions ===
The business unit Graphite Solutions (GS) operates primarily in the areas of graphite specialties. These include synthetic fine grain graphite blocks and expanded natural graphite as well as graphite anode material and materials for fuel cells. The main customer industries of the business unit's varied products and applications are the semiconductor, LED and solar industries, the battery and fuel cell industry, the automotive and transport segment as well as various other industries.

Within the semiconductor segment, SGL Carbon supplies isostatic graphite components for silicon carbide crystal growth furnaces using the Physical Vapor Transport (PVT) method. PVT furnaces operate at temperatures exceeding 2,300 °C and require high-purity graphite with metallic impurities below 5 ppm. SiC crystals grown by PVT are sliced into wafers used as substrates for power semiconductors including SiC MOSFETs and SiC Schottky diodes. SGL Carbon also supplies silicon carbide-coated graphite susceptors for metal-organic chemical vapor deposition (MOCVD) reactors used in gallium nitride epitaxial layer deposition.

As of 2025, SGL Carbon held long-term supply agreements with SiC substrate manufacturers, including prepayment arrangements totalling approximately €116.5 million with Wolfspeed for graphite components used in SiC crystal growth.

=== Process Technology ===
The focus of the Process Technology (PT) business unit is on the construction, maintenance and repair of large systems for industrial applications. These can range from individual components and equipment to complete systems for the synthesis of hydrochloric acid as well as the concentration or dilution and absorption or desorption of a variety of acids. Technologies designed and manufactured by PT to that end include graphite heat exchangers, syntheses and columns as well as pumps and systems with a high resistance against corrosive media. The business unit's most important customer group is, consequently, the chemical industry.

=== Fiber Composites ===
Low weight combined with high rigidity and strength are the key benefits of the products provided by the Fiber Composites business unit. The product portfolio includes carbon fibers, textiles, pre-impregnated materials as well as finished components.The unit focuses on the production of customer-specific components and tailor-made solutions made of composite materials based on glass, aramid and carbon fibers. Battery housing applications and GRP leaf springs as well as various types of carbon-based friction materials for the automotive industry are FC's main focus.

== Locations ==
At the end of 2024, SGL Carbon had a total of 29 production sites (17 in Europe, 8 in North America and 4 in Asia). In Germany – in addition to its headquarters in Wiesbaden – the company has a total of five production facilities, located in Meitingen (near Augsburg), in Bonn in Wackersdorf, in Limburg and in Willich.

In addition, SGL Carbon has an extensive service and distribution network in approximately 80 countries worldwide with which it supplies its customers.

== Nuclear energy applications ==
SGL Carbon supplies nuclear-grade graphite for High-Temperature Gas-cooled Reactors (HTGRs). In January 2026, SGL Carbon entered into a multi-year supply agreement with X-energy for graphite components for X-energy's Xe-100 small modular reactor, including an initial contract exceeding $100 million for a proposed four-unit plant at Dow's Seadrift, Texas site under the U.S. Department of Energy's Advanced Reactor Demonstration Program.

== Electrode cartel and antitrust litigation ==
In the field of graphite electrodes for electric arc furnaces, SGL Carbon was one of eight companies that operated a cartel and fixed prices between July 1992 and June 1997. The primary purpose of the cartel was to fix the price and allocate the volume of graphite electrodes sold in the United States and elsewhere.

SGL Carbon was among the companies accused and fined for operating as a cartel and price fixing in the carbon electrode business. This was initially discovered in the US but later the European commission added their own case and fine.

Eight companies were fined under the EEC action, the largest were Germany's SGL Carbon AG and UCAR International (Now Graftech International Ltd. of the United States). In the finding the EEC states:

The Commission's decision comes after a thorough investigation, which established that the eight producers, which together account for the quasi totality of the production world-wide, operated a secret cartel during most of the 90s resulting in considerably higher prices than if the companies had competed against each other.

SGL Carbon received the highest fine of the eight conspirators, amounting to €80.2 million in Europe in addition to the $135 million in the United States.

To protect itself against damage payments for price fixing, SGL Carbon sought Chapter 11 protection in the United States. The Third Circuit adopted a "good faith" test and rejected a bankruptcy petition filed only because of the magnitude of anticipated antitrust claims.

== Sponsorship ==
SGL Carbon was the main sponsor to the German Cycling team at the 2008 Olympics in Beijing and namesake of the football stadium from the German team FC Augsburg in the first German league from 2011 to 2015.
