= The Nantucket Beacon =

American weekly newspaper in Nantucket, Massachusetts, U.S.

- Type: Weekly Newspaper
- Publisher: Bruce Poor, Edward (Ted) Leach
- Editor: Kurt Mayer, Mark E. Vogler, Don Costanzo
- Founded: 1989
- Ceased publication: 1996
- Headquarters: Nantucket, MA, USA
- ISSN: 1046-6304
- OCLC number: 20474811

The Nantucket Beacon was an American weekly newspaper that was published on Nantucket Island from 1989 until 1996.

== History ==
The Nantucket Beacon was founded in 1989, by Nantucket developer Bruce Poor. The Beacon's first edition (Issue I, Volume 1) was dated 9 March 1989.

Six months after its founding it was sold to New Hampshire newspaper publisher, Edward (Ted) Leach. Leach was the former owner and publisher of the Monadnock Ledger in Peterborough, New Hampshire. He was also the owner and publisher of the McCormick Messenger in McCormick, South Carolina.

There already was another Nantucket newspaper, the 170 yr.-old Inquirer and Mirror. Within months of Leach’s acquisition of the Beacon, the Inquirer and Mirror was sold to Ottaway Newspapers Inc. a division of Dow Jones.

Upon acquiring The Nantucket Beacon, Leach implemented a massive restructuring of all departments of the newspaper. Kurt Mayer was named editor. Leach, together with Mayer, General Manager Jenny Garneau, and a staff of talented writers, artists, computer experts, and sales personnel, guided the newspaper to both regional and national recognition.

Innovation became the hallmark of the Beacon including an email edition and a bi-weekly television program.

In 1994 the Beacon was awarded the General Excellence award from the New England Press Association (now called New England Newspaper and Press Association) as New England’s Weekly Newspaper of the Year. The following year, the National Newspaper Association recognized the Beacon as the top newspaper in its class in the nation. That same year the Beacon was again named New England's top weekly newspaper in the New England Press Association’s annual competition among its more than 300 member newspapers.

Late in 1995, Ottaway bought the Beacon from Leach shuttering it after a year.
