= Max Kennedy =

American lawyer and author

- Born: Matthew Maxwell Taylor Kennedy; January 11, 1965 (age 61); New York City, New York, U.S.
- Education: Harvard University (BA); University of Virginia (JD)
- Occupation: Lawyer
- Political party: Democratic
- Spouse: Victoria Anne Strauss (m. 1991)
- Children: 3, including Max Jr.
- Parents: Robert F. Kennedy; Ethel Skakel
- Family: Kennedy family

Matthew Maxwell Taylor Kennedy (born January 11, 1965) is an American lawyer and author. He is the ninth child of Robert F. Kennedy and Ethel Skakel Kennedy.

== Early life and education ==
Max Kennedy was born in New York City on January 11, 1965, the ninth child of the eleven children of Robert F. Kennedy and Ethel Skakel Kennedy. Kennedy was baptized as a Catholic by William Jerome McCormack at St. Patrick's Cathedral in front of a crowd of 200 people. He is named after General Maxwell D. Taylor, then U.S. Ambassador to Vietnam. Kennedy was hospitalized at age 12 after he suffered an injury in an elevator accident at the Potomac home of his uncle and aunt, Sargent and Eunice Kennedy Shriver.

Described as "wild in his youth," Kennedy was expelled from Phillips Academy in Andover, Massachusetts. He graduated from Moses Brown School, a preparatory school in Providence, Rhode Island, in 1983; and achieved sobriety in 1985.

Kennedy attended Georgetown University in Fall of 1983. He graduated from Harvard College. He then graduated from the University of Virginia School of Law. In 1991, he married Victoria Anne Strauss, the granddaughter of Maurice "Moe" Strauss.

== Career ==
Kennedy was formerly an assistant district attorney in the Philadelphia DA's Office, where he prosecuted felonies and worked in the juvenile crime unit. After three years in the prosecutor's office, he moved to Los Angeles, where he lived in Brentwood, and interrupted his legal career to compile a book on his father. The work, Make Gentle the Life of This World: The Vision of Robert F. Kennedy and the Words That Inspired Him, was published by Harcourt Brace in 1998. Kennedy later returned to the East Coast to lead the Watershed Institute at Boston College, an environmental nonprofit group, and was chairman of the re-election campaign of his uncle, U.S. Senator Ted Kennedy, in 2000. Kennedy also taught English at Boston College for a time.

In 2001, Kennedy explored a campaign for the Democratic nomination for the Massachusetts's 9th congressional district, a seat vacated by Democrat Joe Moakley, and moved from Cambridge, Massachusetts to the 9th district in preparation for a possible run. Kennedy never declared his candidacy, citing his desire to spend time with his family, including his three children under the age of 10. Kennedy later moved to California.

Kennedy wrote Danger's Hour: The Story of the USS Bunker Hill and the Kamikaze Pilot Who Crippled Her, which was released by Simon & Schuster in 2008. The book examines the story of the Essex-class aircraft carrier USS Bunker Hill during the Japanese naval assault of May 1945, in the final chapters of the Second World War. Kirkus Reviews said of the book that Kennedy "describes that attack and its aftermath in scarifying detail that is not for the squeamish" and assessed it as "useful to students of the last months of the Pacific War, though less so than" preceding works on the kamikaze by Emiko Ohnuki-Tierney and David Sears.

Kennedy endorsed Senator Barack Obama in the 2008 Democratic presidential primaries, and campaigned for him. In June 2008, Kennedy introduced Obama at a dinner at Hickory Hill, the McLean, Virginia homestead of his mother, Ethel Kennedy.

In October 2009, Kennedy endorsed Alan Khazei in the January 2010 special election to fill the U.S. Senate seat of his late uncle, Ted Kennedy.

Kennedy was nominated by President Obama to serve as a member of the Board of the Directors of the Overseas Private Investment Corporation (OPIC), and the Senate confirmed him by voice vote in October 2011. He served as a board member from 2011 until January 2018.

In 2004, along with his mother and siblings, Kennedy supported the demolition of the Ambassador Hotel in Los Angeles (the site of his father's 1968 murder) in order to make way for a new public school complex. Kennedy said that a school was "a fitting memorial" for his father and that no part of the hotel site should be retained as a memorial, writing, "The Ambassador Hotel has nothing to do with who my father was or what he tried to do with his life." In 2021, after his father's assassin, Sirhan Sirhan, was recommended for parole, Kennedy was one of six surviving Kennedy children to oppose the proposed release; two other surviving children supported parole for Sirhan.

== Personal life ==
Kennedy married Victoria Anne Strauss on July 13, 1991, at the Cathedral Basilica of Saints Peter and Paul in Philadelphia. They have one son, Matthew Maxwell Taylor Kennedy Jr. (b. 1993), and two daughters, Caroline Summer Rose Kennedy (b. 1994), and Noah Isabella Rose Kennedy (b. 1998).

When Max and Edward Kennedy Jr. were children, grandmother Rose would tell them the story of how their uncle, President John F. Kennedy, saved a member of his PT boat crew in World War II by towing him to an island. Max visited the Solomon Islands in 2002 with Robert Ballard to revisit the scene of the story of John F. Kennedy's PT-109; they met Biuku Gasa and Eroni Kumana, the native coastwatcher scouts who found the missing Kennedy and his crew.

Kennedy has endorsed incumbent Democrat Joe Biden's reelection campaign in the 2024 United States presidential election over a third-party/independent challenge by his brother Robert. After Biden dropped out, Kennedy endorsed Vice President Kamala Harris's campaign, with the siblings denouncing his brother Robert Jr.'s decision to endorse former President Donald Trump, calling the move a "betrayal".

== Books ==
- Make Gentle the Life of This World: The Vision of Robert F. Kennedy (Houghton Mifflin Harcourt, 1998)
- Danger's Hour: The Story of the USS Bunker Hill and the Kamikaze Pilot Who Crippled Her (Simon and Schuster, 2008), ISBN 978-0-7432-6080-0
- Sea Change: A man, a boat, a journey home (Islandport Press, 2018), ISBN 978-1-944762-40-7
