= 2002 Maryland gubernatorial election =

- November 5, 2002
- Turnout: 61.85% ▲1.26%

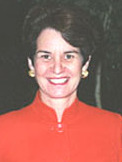
Nominee	Bob Ehrlich	Kathleen Kennedy Townsend
Party	Republican	Democratic
Running mate	Michael Steele	Charles R. Larson
Popular vote	879,592	813,422
Percentage	51.55%	47.68%
- County results Ehrlich: 50–60% 60–70% 70–80% Townsend: 60–70% 70–80%
Governor before election
Parris Glendening
Democratic
Elected Governor
Bob Ehrlich
Republican

The 2002 Maryland gubernatorial election was held on November 5, 2002. Democratic Governor Parris Glendening was term-limited and could not seek a third term. Republican Bob Ehrlich defeated Democrat Kathleen Kennedy Townsend, making him the first Republican governor of Maryland since Spiro Agnew, who served from 1967 to 1969. As of 2026, this is the last time Charles County voted Republican in a statewide election.

This election marked the first time since the 1934 gubernatorial election that a Republican won Maryland without Baltimore City or Montgomery County.

== Democratic primary ==
=== Candidates ===
- Robert Fustero, retired grocery store stock clerk and perennial candidate
- Kathleen Kennedy Townsend, lieutenant governor

=== Results ===
Democratic primary results
Party	Candidate	Votes	%
Democratic	Kathleen Kennedy Townsend	434,948	80.01
Democratic	Robert Fustero	108,659	19.99
Total votes		543,607	100

Fustero's receiving one-fifth of the vote brought surprise, given his non-political background and relatively small campaign spending of less than $1,500 to Kennedy Townsend's $2.3 million. Townsend's campaign spokesman said such results were typical for a challenger in a Maryland Democratic primary. Fustero said it showed that a significant number of Democrats were not happy with Townsend, and predicted (correctly) that Townsend would lose to Ehrlich in the general election. Fustero previously ran for Montgomery County Council and congress, and ran for Montgomery County executive in 2006, placing third in the Democratic primary. He died in 2013 at age 62.

== Republican primary ==
=== Candidates ===
- Bob Ehrlich, U.S. Representative
- Ross Z. Pierpont, perennial candidate
- James J. Sheridan

=== Results ===
Republican primary results
Party	Candidate	Votes	%
Republican	Bob Ehrlich	229,927	92.88
Republican	James J. Sheridan	9,181	3.71
Republican	Ross Z. Pierpont	8,458	3.42
Total votes		247,566	100

== General election ==
Lieutenant Governor Kathleen Kennedy Townsend won the Democratic nomination, and Congressman Bob Ehrlich won the Republican nomination, both over token opposition.

Ehrlich chose Maryland Republican Party Chairman Michael Steele as his running mate, while Townsend chose Admiral Charles R. Larson as her running mate. Larson switched to the Democratic Party just a few weeks before the election.

Kennedy's selection of Larson as her running mate proved to be an unpopular move, seeing as he was a white former Republican and had been selected without consultation with black Democratic leaders. Ehrlich ran advertisements assailing incumbent Governor Parris Glendening for the increasingly dismal fiscal situation in Maryland, an issue that resonated with Maryland voters. Glendening's unpopularity did little to help his Lieutenant Governor's flailing campaign.

=== Predictions ===
Source	Ranking	As of
The Cook Political Report	Tossup	October 31, 2002
Sabato's Crystal Ball	Lean R (flip)	November 4, 2002

=== Polling ===
Poll source	Date(s) administered	Sample size (Note: Key: A – all adults RV – registered voters LV – likely voters V – unclear)	Margin of error	Bob Ehrlich (R)	Kathleen Kennedy Townsend (D)	Other / Undecided
SurveyUSA	October 31 – November 2, 2002	797 (LV)	± 3.6%	51%	46%	2%

=== Results ===
Maryland gubernatorial election, 2002
Party	Candidate	Votes	%	±%
Republican	Bob Ehrlich	879,592	51.55%	+6.74%
Democratic	Kathleen Kennedy Townsend	813,422	47.68%	−7.47%
Libertarian	Spear Lancaster	11,546	0.68%	
Write-ins		1,619	0.09%	
Majority		66,170	3.88%	−6.45%
Turnout		1,706,179		
Republican gain from Democratic		Swing		

==== Results by county ====
County	Kathleen Kennedy Townsend Democratic		Robert Ehrlich Republican		Various candidates Other parties		Margin		Total votes cast
County	#	%	#	%	#	%	#	%	Total votes cast
Allegany	7,831	34.9%	14,416	64.2%	201	0.9%	6,585	29.3%	22,448
Anne Arundel	60,753	34.5%	113,968	64.7%	1,458	0.8%	53,215	30.2%	176,179
Baltimore	106,195	38.0%	170,920	61.2%	2,272	0.8%	64,725	23.2%	279,387
Baltimore City	120,070	75.0%	38,838	24.3%	1,198	0.7%	-81,232	-50.7%	160,106
Calvert	9,854	37.5%	16,193	61.7%	208	0.8%	6,339	24.2%	26,255
Caroline	2,069	24.6%	6,286	74.7%	63	0.8%	4,217	50.1%	8,418
Carroll	12,107	20.2%	47,328	79.0%	511	0.9%	35,221	58.8%	59,946
Cecil	7,668	30.8%	16,956	68.1%	267	1.1%	9,288	37.3%	24,891
Charles	15,149	43.2%	19,695	56.1%	256	0.8%	4,546	12.9%	35,100
Dorchester	3,316	32.1%	6,941	67.2%	68	0.7%	3,625	35.1%	10,325
Frederick	21,913	33.1%	43,646	66.0%	596	0.9%	21,733	32.9%	66,155
Garrett	2,355	26.1%	6,604	73.2%	60	0.6%	4,249	47.1%	9,019
Harford	21,246	24.8%	63,553	74.3%	704	0.8%	42,307	49.5%	85,503
Howard	42,438	44.0%	53,260	55.2%	810	0.8%	10,822	11.2%	96,508
Kent	2,641	34.3%	5,012	65.0%	57	0.7%	2,371	30.7%	7,710
Montgomery	180,576	60.9%	113,680	38.3%	2,278	0.8%	-66,896	-22.6%	296,524
Prince George's	150,927	76.5%	45,193	22.9%	1,074	0.6%	-105,734	-53.6%	197,194
Queen Anne's	4,190	25.2%	12,341	74.2%	111	0.7%	8,151	49.0%	16,642
Somerset	2,052	31.1%	4,516	68.3%	40	0.6%	2,464	37.2%	6,608
St. Mary's	9,048	35.8%	15,986	63.2%	265	1.1%	6,938	27.4%	25,299
Talbot	4,225	29.5%	10,002	69.9%	78	0.6%	5,777	40.4%	14,305
Washington	11,719	30.6%	26,312	68.6%	314	0.9%	14,593	38.0%	38,345
Wicomico	8,775	35.1%	16,054	64.2%	166	0.7%	7,279	29.1%	24,995
Worcester	6,305	34.4%	11,892	64.9%	120	0.6%	5,587	30.5%	18,317
Totals	813,422	47.7%	879,592	51.7%	13,165	0.8%	66,170	3.9%	1,706,179

Counties that flipped from Democratic to Republican

- Alleghany (largest municipality: Cumberland)
- Howard (largest municipality: Columbia)
