= Dorthy Moxley =

American educator and crime victim advocate (1932–2024)

- Born: Dorthy Elaine Jolgren; June 5, 1932; Iron River, Michigan, U.S.
- Died: December 24, 2024 (aged 92); Summit, New Jersey, U.S.
- Education: Michigan State University
- Spouse: J. David Moxley (m. 1956; died 1988)
- Children: 2; including Martha

Dorthy Elaine Moxley (née Jolgren; June 5, 1932 – December 24, 2024) was an American educator and crime victim advocate. She became involved in public and legal efforts following the 1975 murder of her daughter, Martha Moxley, in Greenwich, Connecticut.

== Early life and education ==
Dorthy Elaine Jolgren was born on June 5, 1932, in Iron River, Michigan, to John W. Jolgren and Emma Lundwall. Her father worked as a tool and die maker in the automobile industry in Detroit, and the family lived in Rochester, Michigan. The household initially lacked modern amenities, but her father later installed running water and additional rooms in their home.

Moxley attended Rochester High School, where she was a cheerleader. In 1955, she graduated with a BEd from Michigan State University.

== Career and advocacy ==
Moxley taught fifth grade in Long Beach, California. She married J. David Moxley, a junior naval officer, in 1956. The couple moved to Lawrence, Kansas, where Moxley continued teaching while her husband attended business school.

In 1975, after the murder of her daughter, Martha, Moxley shifted her focus toward advocacy related to the case. Over several decades, she engaged with law enforcement, journalists, and legal professionals to advance investigations and maintain public attention on the unresolved crime. She regularly attended court proceedings and provided public statements, including interviews and participation in documentaries, to support efforts to prosecute those involved. Through the years, Moxley also attended various police and victims' advocacy conferences and assisted family members of victims in other murder cases in their interactions with law enforcement.

Moxley's advocacy coincided with renewed legal action in the late 1990s, culminating in the 2002 conviction of Michael Skakel, which was later vacated following a series of appeals. She continued her involvement in the case through subsequent legal developments, focusing on her efforts to see the judicial process carried out. During her endeavor for justice, she became "a familiar face on Connecticut's TV screens in the early 2000s."

== Personal life and death ==
Moxley and her husband had a son and daughter. The family settled in the Belle Haven neighborhood of Greenwich, Connecticut.

After her husband's sudden death in 1988, Moxley moved to Chatham Township, New Jersey, to be closer to her son. Moxley died from complications of influenza at her home in Summit, New Jersey, on December 24, 2024, at the age of 92.

== See also ==
- Murder in Greenwich
