= George Skakel =

American businessman (1892–1955)

- Born: July 16, 1892; Chicago, Illinois, U.S.
- Died: October 3, 1955 (aged 63) near Union City, Oklahoma, U.S.
- Burial place: Saint Mary's Cemetery, Greenwich, Connecticut, U.S.
- Occupation: Businessman
- Years active: 1919–1955
- Employer(s): The Great Lakes Coal & Coke Company
- Spouse: Ann Brannack (m. 1917)
- Children: 7, including Ethel

George Skakel (/ˈskeɪkəl/ SKAY-kəl; July 16, 1892 – October 3, 1955) was an American businessman. He founded the Great Lakes Carbon Corporation (later to be part of SGL Carbon). His daughter Ethel Kennedy was the widow of Robert F. Kennedy and mother of Secretary of Health and Human Services Robert F. Kennedy Jr.

== Early life ==
Skakel was born in Chicago, Illinois, on July 16, 1892. He was a son of businessman James Curtis Skakel and Grace Mary Jordan, who were Protestants, of part-Dutch ancestry. He had an elder brother William Skakel, a younger sister Margaret Skakel, and a younger brother James Curtis Skakel Jr.

== Career ==
Skakel began his career as a railroad shipping clerk earning $8 a week. While employed by the railroad, he noticed the price volatility of coal fines for coke, which is a byproduct of producing more-in-demand forms of coal. At most times, the coal mining companies were forced to store the coke or pay to have it disposed of in rivers. Skakel came up with an idea to purchase the coke from coal companies. In May 1919, Skakel and two partners put up $1,000 and established The Great Lakes Coal & Coke Company. The company would purchase the coke from coal companies and reprocess it into clean carbon which was used to produce aluminum. By 1929, Skakel had become a multi-millionaire.

The business eventually grew into The Great Lakes Carbon Corporation, which became one of the largest privately held corporations in the United States. After Skakel's death in a plane crash in 1955, his sons George Jr. (who also died in a plane crash, in 1966) and James III took over the business.

== Personal life ==
Skakel married his former secretary, Ann Brannack (1892–1955), on November 25, 1917. Ann was a Roman Catholic. They had seven children:

- Georgeann (1918–1983). Married John Dowdle (1918–1957) in 1945; married George Terrien (1923–1992) in 1958.
- James III (1921–1998). Married Virginia Weinman (1930–1998) in 1952.
- George Jr. (1922–1966). Married Joan Corroon (1928–1967) in 1951.
- Rushton (1923–2003). Married Anne Reynolds (1932–1973) in 1953; married Anna Mae Decker (1937–2019) in 1983. Father of Michael Skakel with Reynolds.
- Patricia (1925–2000). Married Luan Cuffe (1917–1980) in 1949. Their son, Ciarán Cuffe (b. 3 April 1963), is an Irish politician who served as a Member of the European Parliament (MEP) from Ireland for the Dublin constituency from July 2019 to July 2024.
- Ethel (1928–2024). Married Robert F. Kennedy (1925–1968) in 1950.
- Ann (1933–2023). Married John McCooey (1928–2011) in 1954.

On October 3, 1955, George and Ann Skakel were killed when the private plane in which they were traveling crashed near Union City, Oklahoma. They are buried at Saint Mary's Cemetery in Greenwich, Connecticut.
