= Kathleen Kennedy Townsend =

American politician and attorney

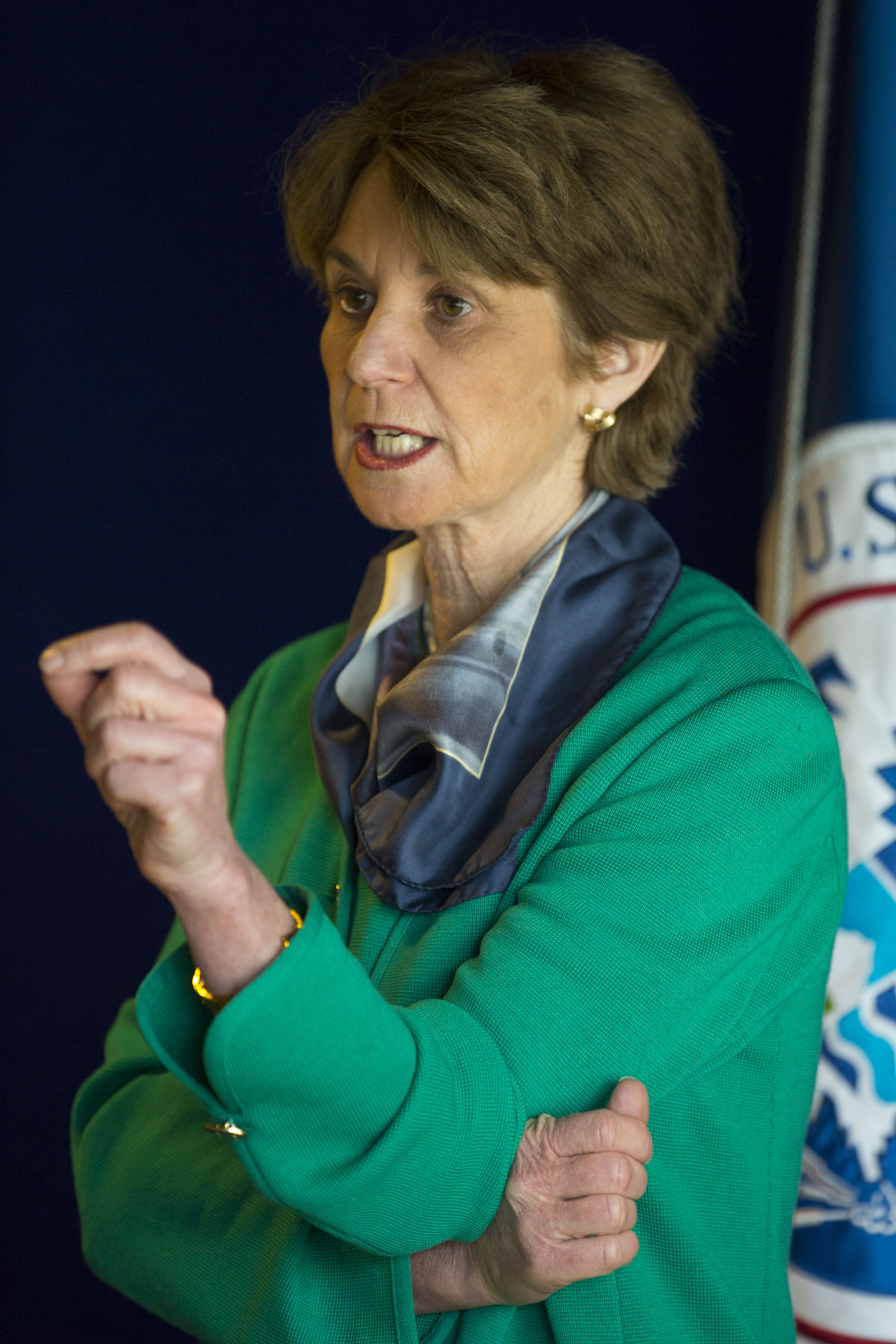
- Kennedy Townsend in 2014

6th Lieutenant Governor of Maryland
- In office January 18, 1995 – January 15, 2003
- Governor: Parris Glendening
- Preceded by: Melvin Steinberg
- Succeeded by: Michael Steele

Personal details
- Born: Kathleen Hartington Kennedy; July 4, 1951 (age 75) Greenwich, Connecticut, U.S.
- Party: Democratic
- Spouse: David Townsend (m. 1973)
- Children: 4, including Maeve
- Parents: Robert F. Kennedy; Ethel Skakel
- Relatives: Kennedy family
- Education: Radcliffe College (BA); University of New Mexico (JD)

Kathleen Hartington Kennedy Townsend (born July 4, 1951) is an American politician and attorney who served as the sixth lieutenant governor of Maryland from 1995 to 2003. She was the first woman to serve in that role. A member of the Democratic Party, she ran unsuccessfully for governor of Maryland in 2002.

In 2010, Townsend became the chair of the non-profit American Bridge, an organization whose focus is to raise funds for Democratic candidates and causes. In 2021, she was appointed in the United States Department of Labor as an advisor on retirement. She is the oldest living member of the prominent political Kennedy family, and is the oldest grandchild of Joseph P. Kennedy Sr. and Rose Fitzgerald Kennedy.

== Early life and education ==
Kathleen Hartington Kennedy was born on July 4, 1951, in Greenwich, Connecticut, the eldest of Robert F. Kennedy and Ethel Skakel's 11 children. She was named after her paternal aunt Kathleen Cavendish, Marchioness of Hartington, who died in a plane crash three years before Kennedy was born. Kennedy is the eldest grandchild of Joseph P. Kennedy Sr. and Rose Kennedy. She spent her childhood between the family's homes in McLean, Virginia and Hyannis Port, Massachusetts. While growing up, it was not assumed that the girls in the politically oriented Kennedy family would run for office. However, after her uncle, President John F. Kennedy, was assassinated, her father wrote Kathleen saying, "As the oldest of the next generation you have a particular responsibility. ... Be kind to others and work for your country." Her family gave her the nicknames "Clean Kathleen", "the Nun", and "the Un-Kennedy".

Over the summer of 1964, Kennedy won four blue ribbons for her "excellence in horsemanship". On August 29, 1965, the 14-year-old Kennedy was somersaulted by her horse while competing at Sea Flash Farms in West Barnstable, Massachusetts. She was left unconscious and bleeding internally and was rushed to Cape Cod Hospital, located fifteen miles away. Kennedy’s family was en route to Hyannis Port at the time of the incident and was not located for another three hours.

Kennedy was 16 when her father was assassinated. The night he was shot at the Ambassador Hotel, Kennedy and her two oldest brothers, Joseph II and Robert Jr., were being flown to Los Angeles aboard one of the planes in the Secret Service's presidential fleet named "the Jet Star".

Kennedy was educated at Our Lady of Victory Elementary School in Washington, D.C., and later graduated from The Putney School in Vermont. She attended Radcliffe College, receiving her bachelor's degree in history and literature in 1974. Kennedy then studied at the University of New Mexico School of Law, receiving her Juris Doctor degree in 1978.

== Early career ==
After graduating from law school, Kennedy worked as an attorney at a private law firm, Clendenen & Lesser, in New Haven, Connecticut, while her husband, David Townsend, attended Yale Law School. In 1982, Kathleen was admitted to the Massachusetts bar, and worked as a law clerk for U.S. District Court Judge A. David Mazzone in Boston. She also worked on her uncle Ted Kennedy's 1980 presidential campaign, stumped for local Democrats, and was hired as a policy analyst for Massachusetts Governor Michael Dukakis in the early 1980s while she and her husband resided in Newton, Massachusetts.

In 1984, the family settled in the Baltimore area, in her husband's home state. In 1985, Kathleen was admitted to the Maryland bar. She went to work for the state's government, holding numerous posts including assistant Maryland Attorney General from 1985 to 1986. Townsend became the first Kennedy family member to lose a general election when she ran for the U.S. House of Representatives in Maryland's strongly Republican 2nd congressional district in 1986, using the name Townsend only. Incumbent Republican Helen Delich Bentley defeated her 59% to 41%.

After her failed congressional bid, Townsend took a job at the U.S. Justice Department in 1993 overseeing grants to local police departments and community groups.

== Lieutenant governor of Maryland ==
=== 1994 election ===
In 1994, Parris Glendening was running for governor in a highly contested primary against then-Lt. Governor Melvin Steinberg when he selected her as his running mate. Experts did not believe she would be an asset, but her name recognition (she now used the name Kennedy Townsend) and her fund-raising skills helped him to win.

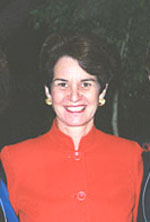
Townsend in 2001

In the general election, Glendening and Townsend beat Republican candidate Ellen Sauerbrey in one of Maryland's closest and most controversial gubernatorial elections. After unofficial results indicated that Sauerbrey had lost the election by a narrow margin, she began making what The Washington Post called "sensational charges" that the election had been stolen. Sauerbrey's allegations included ballot box stuffing, 100% voting in one precinct, and voting by numerous dead people, among rumors of a Kennedy "precedent" suggesting John F. Kennedy had stolen the 1960 presidential election via Chicago and therefore his niece Townsend must have stolen this election.

The official vote tally declared Glendening the winner by 5,993 votes out of 1.4 million. Sauerbrey hired an election specialist known for aggressive tactics, then filed a lawsuit alleging that 50,000 votes had been cast illegally. By the time the hearing began in January 1995, however, Sauerbrey had backed away from the fraud charges and her claim centered on sloppy election procedures and 3,600 challenged ballots. The number of challenged ballots would not have been enough to change the result even if all of them were thrown out. The judge ruled that about 1,800 votes had been cast in Baltimore by people whose names should have been purged from the rolls, but said that there was no clear and convincing evidence that fraud or procedural errors had affected the outcome. Sauerbrey dropped the suit three days before Glendening was to be inaugurated, but still maintained her belief that she had won the election.

Sauerbrey ran against Glendening again in 1998, but this time Glendening and Townsend won by a much wider margin (55% to 44%).

=== Tenure ===
During her tenure as lieutenant governor, Townsend helped make Maryland the first state to require community service for high school graduation. Her state biography says that during her tenure, funding for after-school programs more than doubled—to $14 million—and the After-School Program Initiative was launched. Townsend founded the Maryland Police Corps, which recruited and trained officers in community policing. She created the HotSpot Communities Initiative, which brought together local organizations, law enforcement, and government agencies to coordinate strategies in high-crime areas. Her Break the Cycle initiative combined testing, graduated penalties, and treatment programs to help offenders remain drug-free; it reduced drug use by more than half among offenders in the program.

In her role as chair of the Cabinet Council on Business, Economic Development, and Transportation, Townsend guided economic initiatives including support for the Maryland Technology Development Corporation, more opportunities for small and minority-owned businesses, growth in the biotechnology sector, and investments in Baltimore/Washington International Airport. With Governor Parris Glendening, she helped enact reduction or elimination of more than 30 taxes.

During the 2000 presidential election, Townsend travelled to Iowa to campaign for Al Gore.

== 2002 gubernatorial election ==
In the Maryland gubernatorial election of 2002, Townsend faced Republican Bob Ehrlich and Libertarian Spear Lancaster in the general election.

During the campaign, Townsend was criticized for her choice of running mate, Admiral Charles R. Larson, a novice politician who had switched parties only a few weeks before. Some also criticized the choice of a white male as unlikely to help minority turnout. Ehrlich's running mate was Michael Steele, an African-American lawyer who had been chairman of the Republican Party of Maryland.

Though Maryland traditionally votes Democratic and had not elected a Republican governor in almost 40 years, Townsend lost the race, gaining 48% of the vote to Ehrlich's 51% and Lancaster's 1%. Ehrlich became only the seventh Republican governor in state history. In the end, most observers agreed she ran a weak campaign. They specifically cited a lack of planning, claiming that she hastily booked campaign stops in rural areas hostile to her. The Baltimore Sun said the defeat derailed her political career, at least in the short run.

== Later career ==
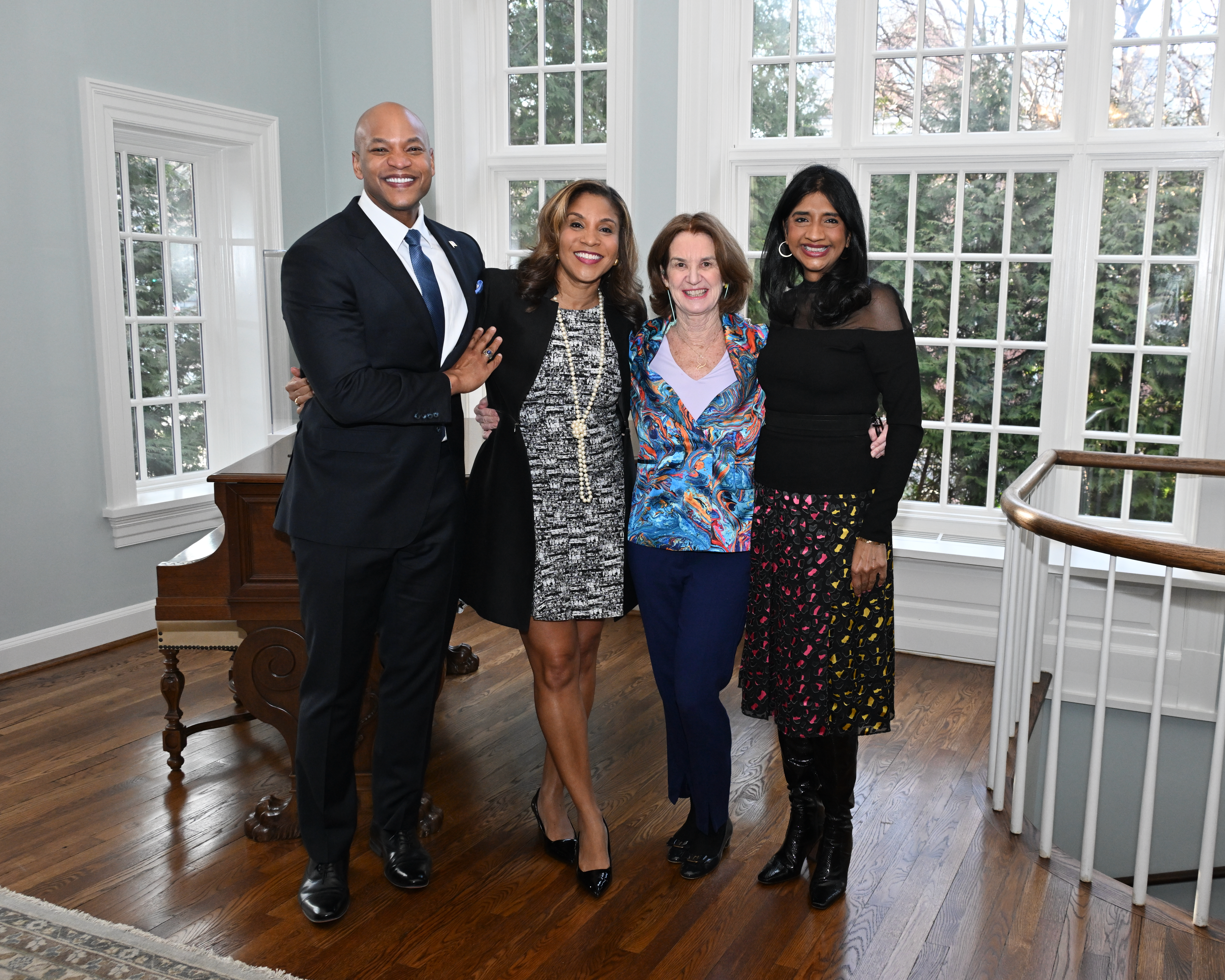
Townsend with Maryland Governor Wes Moore, First Lady Dawn Moore, and Lieutenant Governor Aruna Miller, 2025

Townsend, along with siblings Robert, Jr. and Kerry, endorsed Hillary Clinton for president in the 2008 Democratic primaries.

Townsend wrote the book Failing America's Faithful: How Today's Churches Are Mixing God with Politics and Losing Their Way, published in 2007. She also contributes to The Recovering Politician, a website started by Jonathan Miller.

Townsend is an adjunct professor at the Georgetown Public Policy Institute, a visiting fellow at Harvard Kennedy School at Harvard University, and senior Nitze fellow at St. Mary's College of Maryland.

In December 2010, Townsend was appointed chair of American Bridge, a new non-profit that would raise funds for Democratic candidates and causes, and that was intended to be a Democratic counterpart to right-leaning organizations such as American Crossroads and Crossroads GPS. She noted that the Democrats did not have such an organization during the 2010 election cycle, and that Republicans outspent the Democrats by $70 million. Townsend stated, "I want to compete dollar to a dollar with the Republicans and I want to beat them".

On August 30, 2021, Townsend joined the U.S. Department of Labor as the lead advisor to then U.S. Secretary of Labor Marty Walsh on the issue of retirement.

Townsend endorsed incumbent Democrat Joe Biden's reelection campaign in the 2024 United States presidential election over a third-party/independent challenge by her brother Robert. Four months later, Townsend and four of her siblings endorsed Democratic Vice President Kamala Harris's campaign in the 2024 United States presidential election, and denounced their brother Robert Jr.'s decision to endorse former President Donald Trump, calling the move a "betrayal".

== Personal life ==
In 1973, Kathleen married David Lee Townsend (born 1947), whom she had met when he was a graduate student and her tutor at Radcliffe. As of April 2020, David is a member of the faculty at St. John's College in Annapolis. They have four daughters:

- Meaghan Anne Kennedy Townsend (born November 7, 1977)
- Maeve Fahey Kennedy Townsend (November 1, 1979 – April 2, 2020)
- Rose Katherine "Kat" Kennedy Townsend (born December 17, 1983)
- Kerry Sophia Kennedy Townsend (born November 30, 1991)

On June 27, 2011, Maeve gave birth to a son named Gideon Joseph Kennedy McKean. Gideon was the first great-grandchild for Bobby and Ethel, as well as the first of the fifth generation of Kennedys.

Maeve and son Gideon went missing, and were presumed dead, in a canoeing accident that occurred on April 2, 2020. After 26 hours, the recovery mission was suspended. Maeve's body was found in the Chesapeake Bay on April 6 and Gideon's body was recovered two days later. His body was 2,000 feet (610 m) from where his mother's was found.

In May 2026, she sold the beach house she owned near the Hyannis Port Kennedy compound in Cape Cod, Massachusetts.

== Boards ==
Townsend has served on the boards of many organizations, and as a consultant to several corporations. She is the chair of the Institute for Human Virology at the University of Maryland. Townsend is on the boards of directors of the John F. Kennedy Library Foundation, the Points of Light Foundation, the Center for American Progress and Catholic Democrats. She was formerly on the independent Advisory Council of the Association of Community Organizations for Reform Now (ACORN), a panel that was appointed to review the functioning of ACORN following the scandal touched off by hidden camera videos in September 2009, and the board of the National Catholic Reporter. Townsend is also a member of the Council on Foreign Relations and the Inter-American Dialogue. She is also on the Board of Selectors of Jefferson Awards for Public Service. Townsend is on the board of directors at the Lightbridge nuclear fuel technology company.

== Electoral history ==
2002 gubernatorial election, Maryland
Party	Candidate	Votes	%
Republican	Robert Ehrlich / Michael Steele	879,592	51.6
Democratic	Kathleen Kennedy Townsend / Charles R. Larson	813,422	47.7
Libertarian	Spear Lancaster	11,546	0.7
Republican gain from Democratic			

1998 gubernatorial election, Maryland Lieutenant Governor's seat – sharing one ballot space with the nominee for Gov.
Party	Candidate	Votes	%
Democratic	Parris Glendening (incumbent) / Kathleen Kennedy Townsend (incumbent)	846,972	55.2
Republican	Ellen Sauerbrey / Richard D. Bennett	688,357	44.8
Democratic hold			

1994 gubernatorial election, Maryland Lieutenant Governor's seat – sharing one ballot space with the nominee for Gov.
Party	Candidate	Votes	%
Democratic	Parris Glendening / Kathleen Kennedy Townsend	708,094	50.2
Republican	Ellen Sauerbrey / Paul Rappaport	702,101	49.8
Democratic hold			

1986 U.S. congressional election, Maryland's 2nd district
Party	Candidate	Votes	%
Republican	Helen Delich Bentley	96.745	59%
Democratic	Kathleen Kennedy Townsend	68,200	41%
Republican hold			

== See also ==
- List of female lieutenant governors in the United States

Political offices
Preceded by Melvin Steinberg	Lieutenant Governor of Maryland; 1995–2003	Succeeded by Michael Steele
Party political offices
Preceded by Parris Glendening	Democratic nominee for Governor of Maryland; 2002	Succeeded by Martin O'Malley
