= Ethel Kennedy =

American human rights advocate (1928–2024)

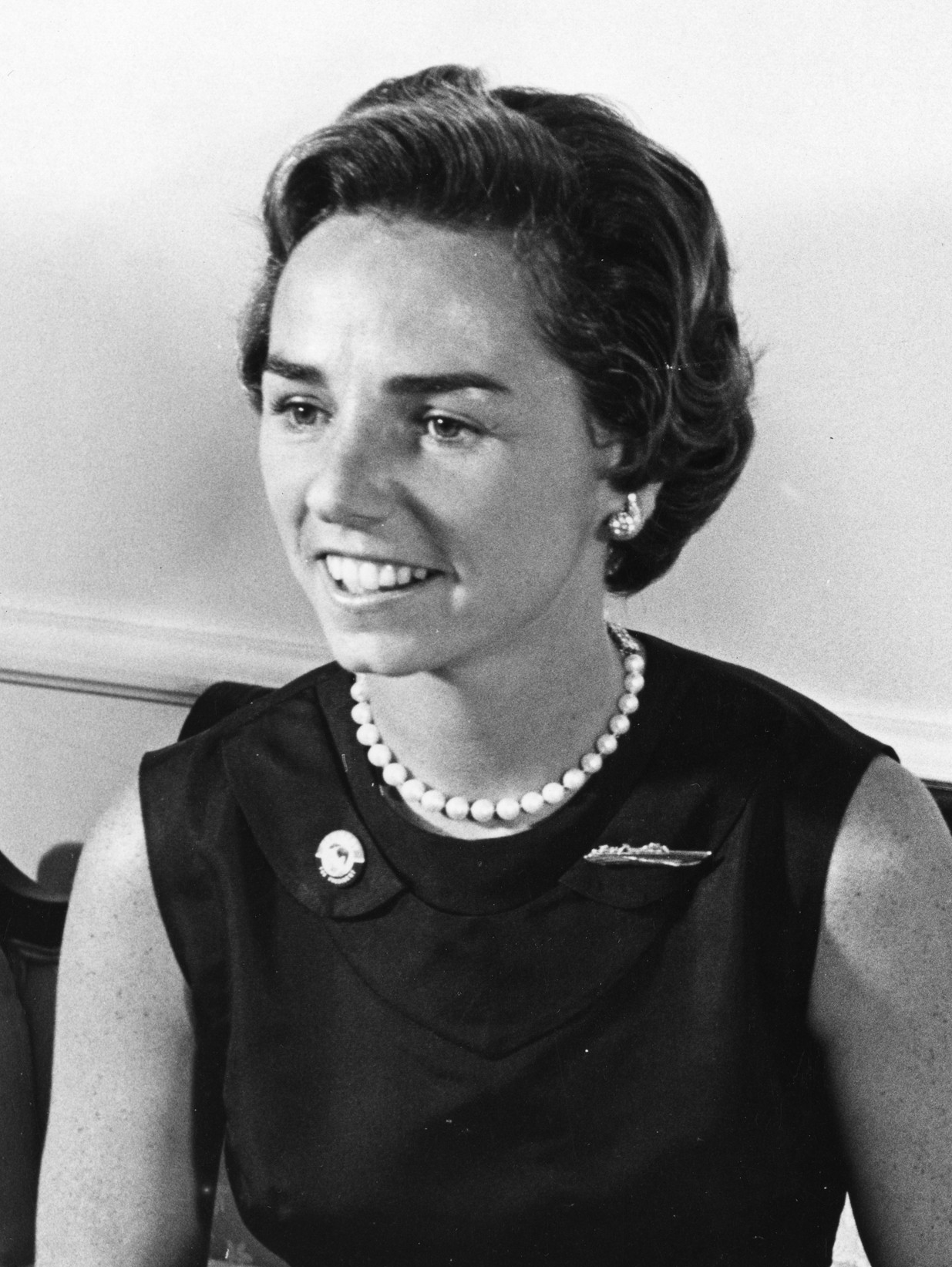
- Kennedy in 1968
- Born: Ethel Skakel; April 11, 1928; Chicago, Illinois, U.S.
- Died: October 10, 2024 (aged 96); Boston, Massachusetts, U.S.
- Burial place: Arlington National Cemetery
- Education: Manhattanville College (BA)
- Political party: Democratic
- Spouse: Robert F. Kennedy (m. 1950; died 1968)
- Children: 11, including Kathleen, Joseph II, Robert Jr., Michael, Kerry, Chris, Max, Douglas, and Rory
- Father: George Skakel
- Family: Kennedy family (by marriage)
- Awards: Presidential Medal of Freedom (2014)

Ethel Kennedy (née Skakel /ˈskeɪkəl/ SKAY-kəl; April 11, 1928 – October 10, 2024) was an American human rights advocate. She was the widow of U.S. Senator Robert F. Kennedy, a sister-in-law of U.S. president John F. Kennedy, and a daughter of businessman George Skakel.

== Early life and education ==
Ethel Skakel was born on April 11, 1928, in Chicago, Illinois, to businessman George Skakel and Ann Brannack. She was the sixth of seven children, with a younger sister named Ann and five elder siblings: Georgeann, James, George Jr., Rushton, and Patricia.

George Skakel was the founder of Great Lakes Carbon Corporation, which later became a division of SGL Carbon. He was of Dutch descent and a Protestant while Ann was of Irish ancestry and practiced the Catholic faith. Their children were raised Catholic, and Ethel, a devout Catholic herself, attended mass regularly throughout her life.

Ethel and her siblings were raised in Greenwich, Connecticut. She attended the all-girls Greenwich Academy and graduated from the Convent of the Sacred Heart in 1945. In September 1945, Ethel began her college education at Manhattanville College, where she was a classmate of her future sister-in-law Jean Kennedy. Ethel received a bachelor's degree from Manhattanville in 1949.

Ethel first met Jean's brother, Robert F. Kennedy, during a ski trip to Mont Tremblant Resort in Quebec in December 1945. During that trip, Robert began dating Ethel's older sister Patricia, but after that relationship ended, he began dating Ethel. She campaigned for Robert's older brother John in his 1946 campaign for Congress in Massachusetts's 11th congressional district and wrote her college thesis on his book Why England Slept.

== Marriage and family ==
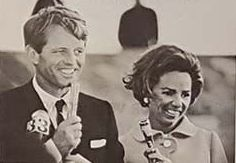
Robert and Ethel Kennedy in 1968

Robert Kennedy and Ethel Skakel became engaged in February 1950 and were married on June 17, 1950, in a Catholic ceremony at the St. Mary Church in Greenwich, Connecticut. The Boston Globe noted that the marriage "unites two large fortunes".

After Robert graduated from law school at the University of Virginia, the family settled in the Washington, D.C., area, and Robert went to work for the Justice Department. In 1952, Ethel and Robert moved into a rooming house in Boston, Massachusetts, and she helped contribute to her brother-in-law John's Senate campaign by organizing "tea parties" for potential voters. Several months after the birth of Ethel's fourth child, her parents were both killed in a plane crash in Union City, Oklahoma, on October 3, 1955.

In 1956, the Kennedys purchased Hickory Hill from Robert's brother John and his wife, Jacqueline. The estate was situated on six acres in McLean, Virginia, (west of Washington, D.C.) with a 13-bedroom mansion. Robert and Ethel held many gatherings at their home and were known for their impressive and eclectic guest lists. Ethel sold Hickory Hill for $8.25 million in December 2009. The couple also owned a home in Hyannis Port, Massachusetts, on Cape Cod.

In 1960, Ethel's brother-in-law John won the presidential election, at which time he appointed Robert to the post of attorney general. Two years later, President Kennedy assigned Ethel and Robert to tour 14 countries on a 28-day goodwill trip. Though the trip was said to be informal, the host countries viewed Robert and Ethel as stand-ins for the President and the First Lady.

On November 22, 1963, Ethel learned of John's assassination from her husband. She had answered the phone, identified the caller as Federal Bureau of Investigation (FBI) Director J. Edgar Hoover, and handed the phone to Robert, who then informed her of the shooting. Hoover had never called the Attorney General's home before.

In 1964, Ethel supported her husband while he campaigned for and won a seat in the United States Senate, representing New York. During the campaign, Robert was accused of "carpetbagging", and Ethel made light of the criticism by suggesting the slogan, "There is only so much you can do for Massachusetts."

Ethel urged her husband to enter the Democratic primary for the 1968 presidential election. Biographer Evan Thomas portrayed her as Robert's "most consistent advocate of a race for the White House".

=== Children ===
Ethel Kennedy had 11 children from her almost 18-year marriage: Kathleen in 1951, Joseph in 1952, Robert Jr. in 1954, David in 1955, Courtney in 1956, Michael in 1958, Kerry in 1959, Christopher in 1963, Maxwell in 1965, Douglas in 1967, and Rory in 1968. Rory was born six months after her father was assassinated. Kathleen served as lieutenant governor of Maryland from 1995 to 2003, Joseph represented Massachusetts's 8th congressional district in the U.S. House of Representatives from 1987 to 1999, and Robert Jr. ran for president in the 2024 presidential election before becoming U.S. secretary of health and human services. Her grandson, Joseph Kennedy III, also served in the U.S. House of Representatives, representing Massachusetts's 4th congressional district from 2013 to 2021. Kennedy outlived two of her sons, David and Michael, who respectively died from a 1984 drug overdose and a 1997 skiing accident.

=== Husband's assassination ===
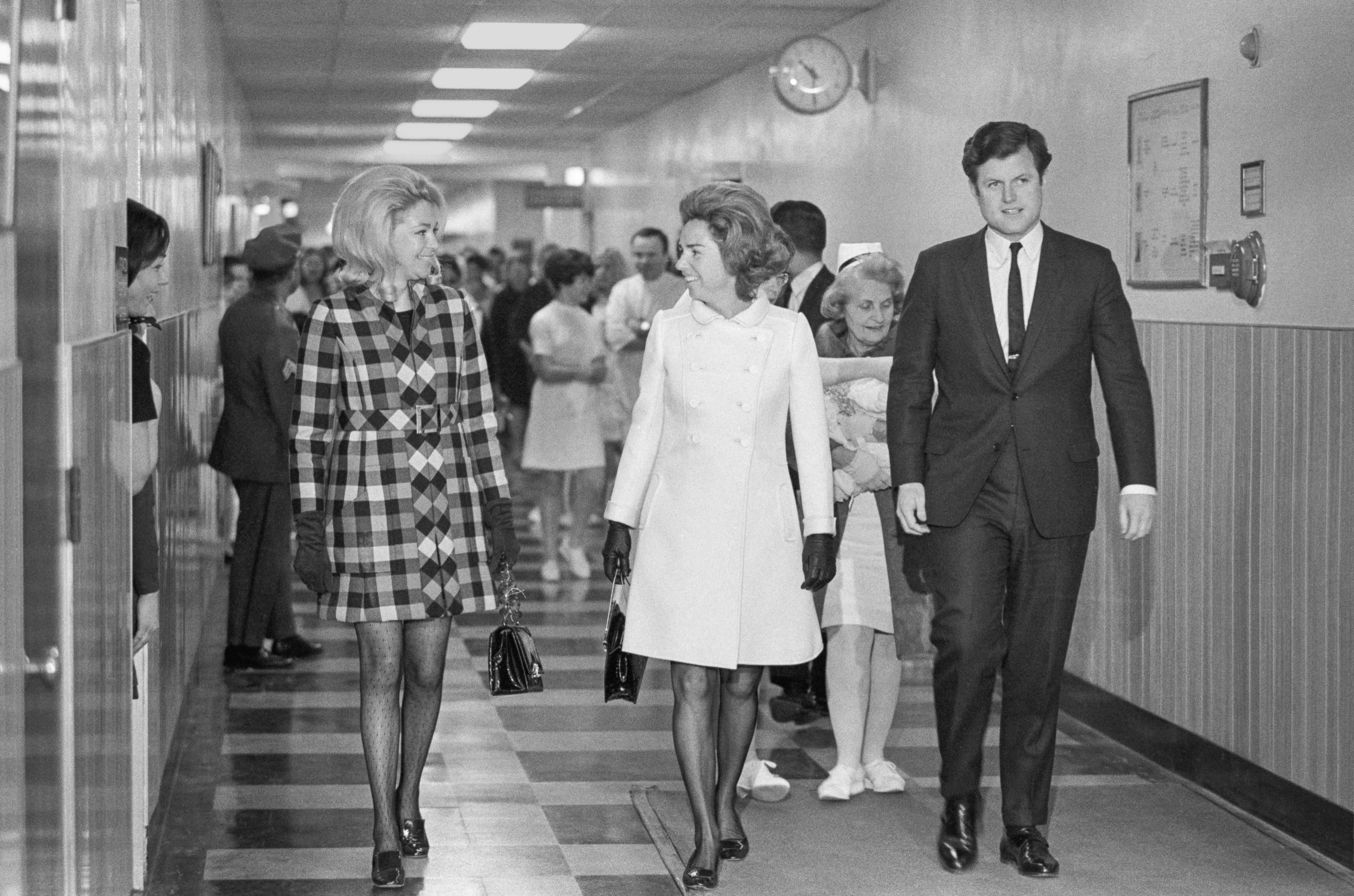
Joan Kennedy, Ethel Kennedy and Ted Kennedy in December 1968

Shortly after midnight on June 5, 1968, Robert F. Kennedy was mortally wounded by Sirhan Sirhan at the Ambassador Hotel in Los Angeles; he died the following day at age 42. Ethel was present at the scene and was three months pregnant with daughter Rory at the time. President Lyndon B. Johnson declared a National Day of Mourning. Ethel sent Johnson a handwritten note on June 19, thanking him and his wife, First Lady Lady Bird Johnson, for the help they had given her and the Kennedy family. After her husband's death, Ethel publicly stated that she would never marry again, wanting to focus on "furthering his work and legacy". For a time, Ethel was escorted to dinners, parties, and theaters by singer and family friend Andy Williams.

== Robert F. Kennedy Center for Justice and Human Rights ==
Ethel Kennedy founded the Robert F. Kennedy Center for Justice and Human Rights (now known as Robert F. Kennedy Human Rights) in 1968. In February 2001, Kennedy visited Rodolfo Montiel and another peasant activist at their jail in Iguala, presenting Rodolfo with the Chico Mendes Award on behalf of American environmental group the Sierra Club. In March 2016, Kennedy was among hundreds who marched near the home of Wendy's chairman Nelson Peltz in Palm Beach, Florida, as part of an effort by the Coalition of Immokalee Workers, a farm workers' group, to convince the company to pay an additional one cent per pound of tomatoes to increase the wages of field workers. Kennedy's daughter Kerry was president of Robert F. Kennedy Human Rights, according to the Fund's 2022 annual report.

== Later life and death ==
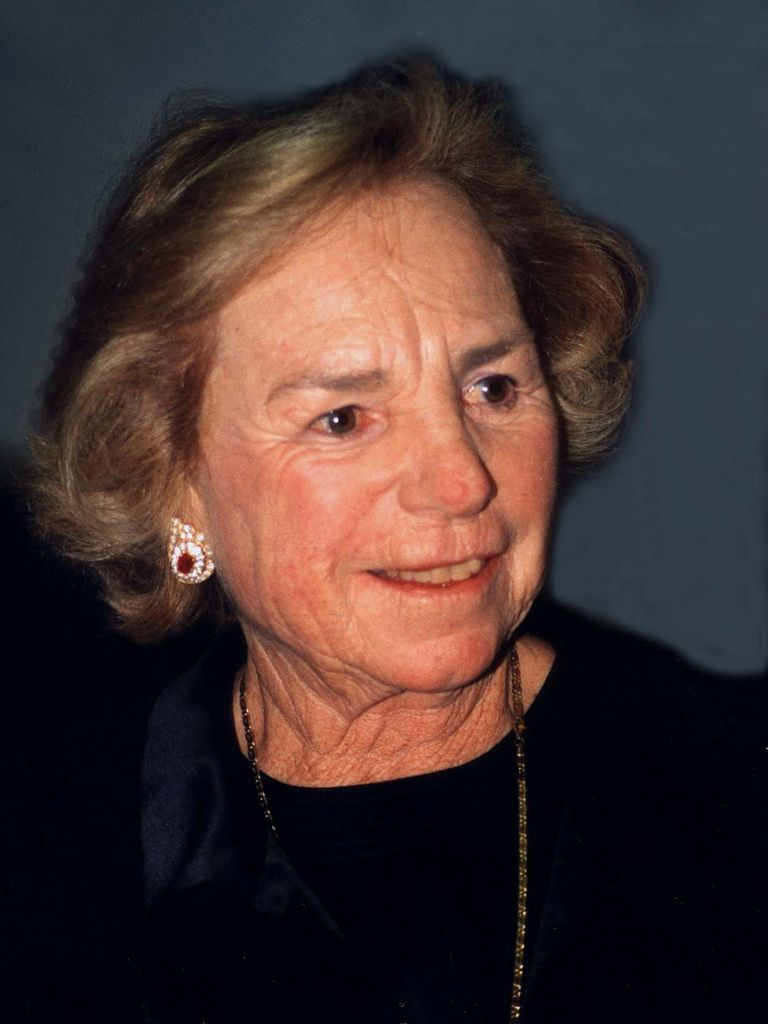
Kennedy in 2000

During the late 1970s, with a renewed commitment to public service, Kennedy focused much of her time and energy on various social causes, including the Bedford Stuyvesant Restoration Project. In 1992, Kennedy and her son Michael made a cameo appearance on the NBC sitcom Cheers in Boston.

During the 2008 Democratic Party presidential primaries, Kennedy endorsed Barack Obama. She publicly supported and held fundraisers at Hickory Hill for numerous politicians that included Virginia gubernatorial candidate Brian Moran. Kennedy hosted a $6 million fundraising dinner for Obama at Hickory Hill in June 2008. The $28,500-a-plate dinner was headlined by former Democratic presidential candidate and Democratic National Committee (DNC) chairman Howard Dean.

In 2012, she appeared in a documentary about her life, directed by Rory Kennedy, her youngest child. The documentary, entitled Ethel, covers Kennedy's early political involvement, her life with Robert F. Kennedy, and the years following his death when she raised 11 children on her own. It features interviews with Kennedy and her children interspersed with family videos and archival photos.

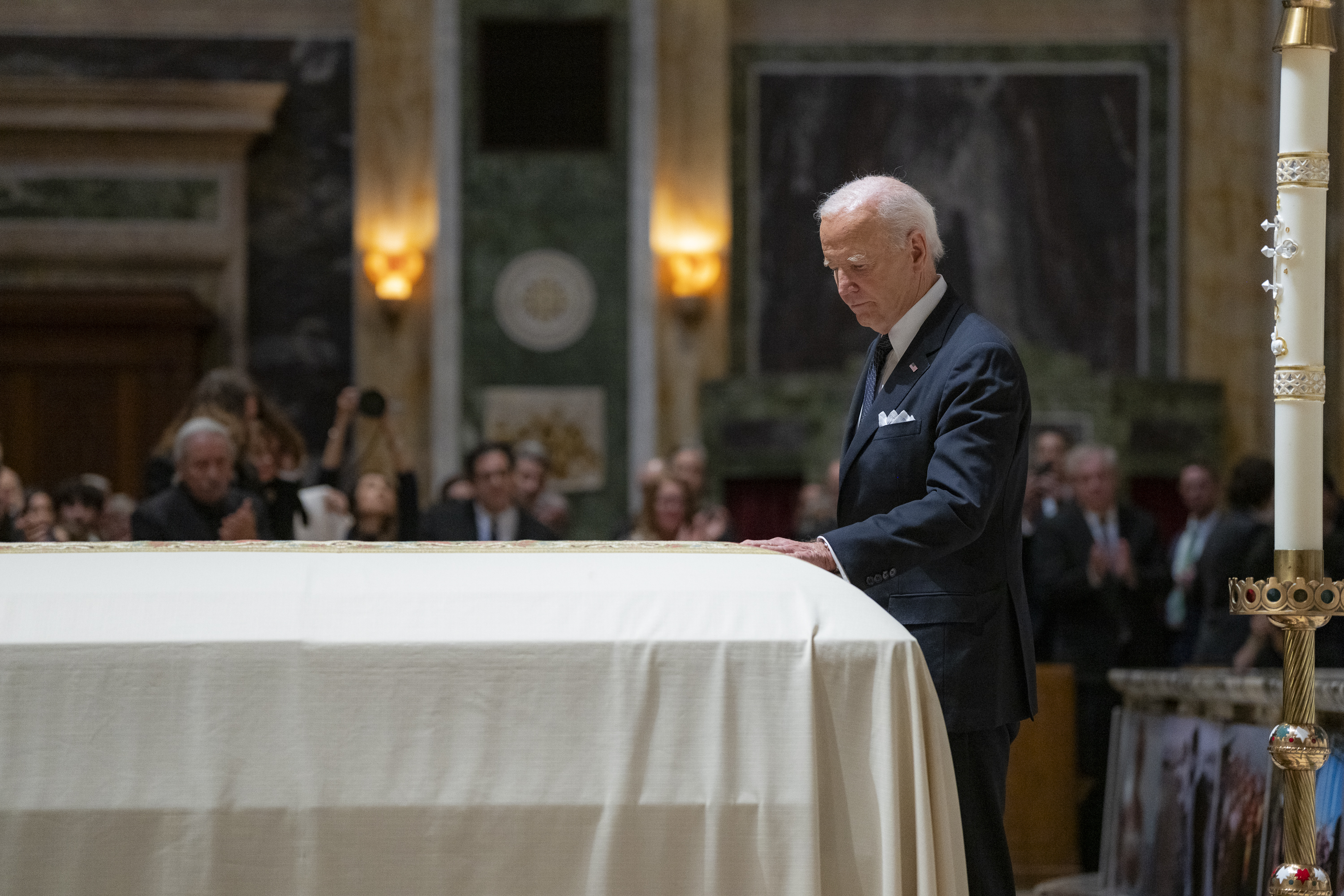
President Joe Biden with Kennedy's coffin at her funeral, October 2024

In her later years, Kennedy resided at the Kennedy Compound in Massachusetts and in Palm Beach, Florida. She died in Boston on October 10, 2024, at age 96, after being hospitalized for a stroke she had the week prior. Kennedy's funeral was held four days later at Our Lady of Victory Church in Centerville, Massachusetts. On October 16, a memorial service was held at the Roman Catholic Cathedral of St. Matthew the Apostle in Washington, D.C., with eulogies given by President Joe Biden and former presidents Barack Obama and Bill Clinton. Kennedy is buried at Arlington National Cemetery alongside her husband.

== Legacy and awards ==
In 1981, President Ronald Reagan honored Kennedy with the Robert F. Kennedy medal in the White House Rose Garden. In 2014, a bridge over the Anacostia River in Washington, D.C., was renamed the Ethel Kennedy Bridge in her honor, in recognition of her advocacy for environmentalism and social causes in the District of Columbia. That same year, Kennedy was awarded the Presidential Medal of Freedom by President Obama for her dedication to "advancing the cause of social justice, human rights, environmental protection, and poverty reduction by creating countless ripples of hope to effect change around the world".
