= Mary Augusta Kennedy =

American activist (1857–1923)

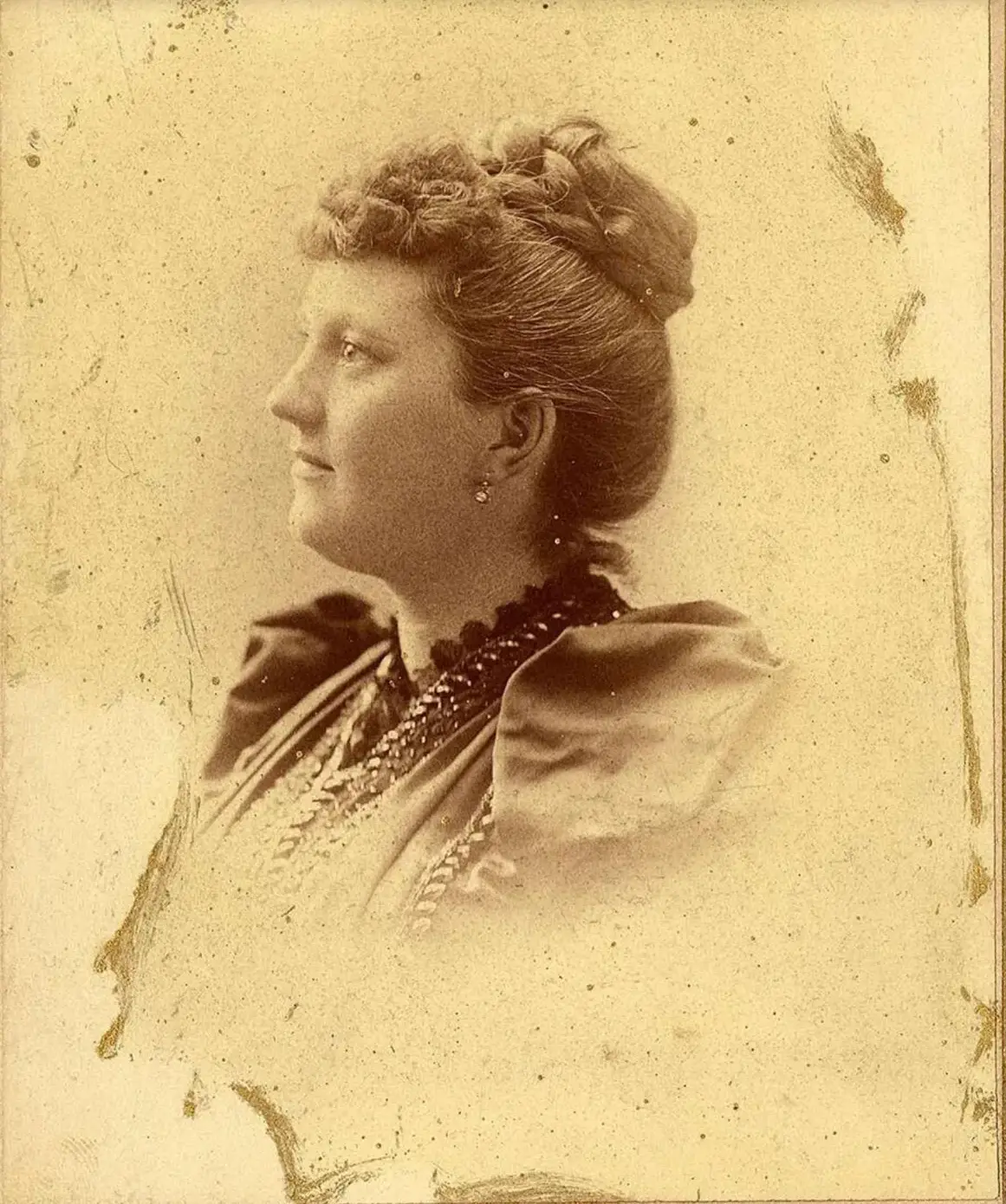
- Kennedy in 1887
- Born: Mary Augusta Hickey; December 6, 1857; Winthrop, Massachusetts, U.S
- Died: May 20, 1923 (aged 65); Boston, Massachusetts, U.S
- Burial place: Holy Cross Cemetery, Malden, Massachusetts
- Spouse: P. J. Kennedy (m. 1887)
- Children: 4, including Joseph Sr.
- Parents: James Hickey (father); Margaret Field Hickey (mother)
- Relatives: Kennedy family

Mary Augusta Kennedy (née Hickey; December 6, 1857 – May 20, 1923) was an American activist, a member of the Kennedy Family and the wife of P. J. Kennedy. She was the mother of Joseph P. Kennedy Sr. and the grandmother of U.S President John F. Kennedy.

== Background ==
Mary was born on December 6, 1857 in Winthrop, Massachusetts to Margaret "Martha" Hickey (née Field) and James Hickey. Her father was a saloon keeper from Brockton, Massachusetts, who later became a contractor. Her mother was born on a tenant farm. Her sister was the mayor of Brockton. Both of her parents were immigrants from County Cork, Ireland. She was active in women's suffrage in the United States.

== Marriage & Children ==
On November 23, 1887, she married P. J. Kennedy and they had four children; her eldest being Joseph Sr. the father of President John. F Kennedy, born on September 6, 1888. Due to her husband's growing political career in Boston's Democratic Party and his increasing wealth the family lived in a large private home on Jeffries Point in East Boston.

Augusta and Patrick's children were Joseph Patrick Kennedy Sr. (1888–1969), who married Rose Elizabeth Fitzgerald in 1914 and had nine children; Francis Benedict Kennedy (1891–1892), who died of diphtheria at fifteen months old; Mary Loretta Kennedy (1892–1972), who married George William Connelly in 1927 and had one daughter; and Margaret Louise Kennedy (1898–1974), who married Charles Joseph Burke in 1924 and had three children.

== Death & Burial ==
She died on May 20, 1923 in Boston, and was buried in the Holy Cross Cemetery in Malden, Massachusetts.
