= Rose Kennedy =

American philanthropist, member of Kennedy family (1890–1995)

- Countess of the Holy Roman Church
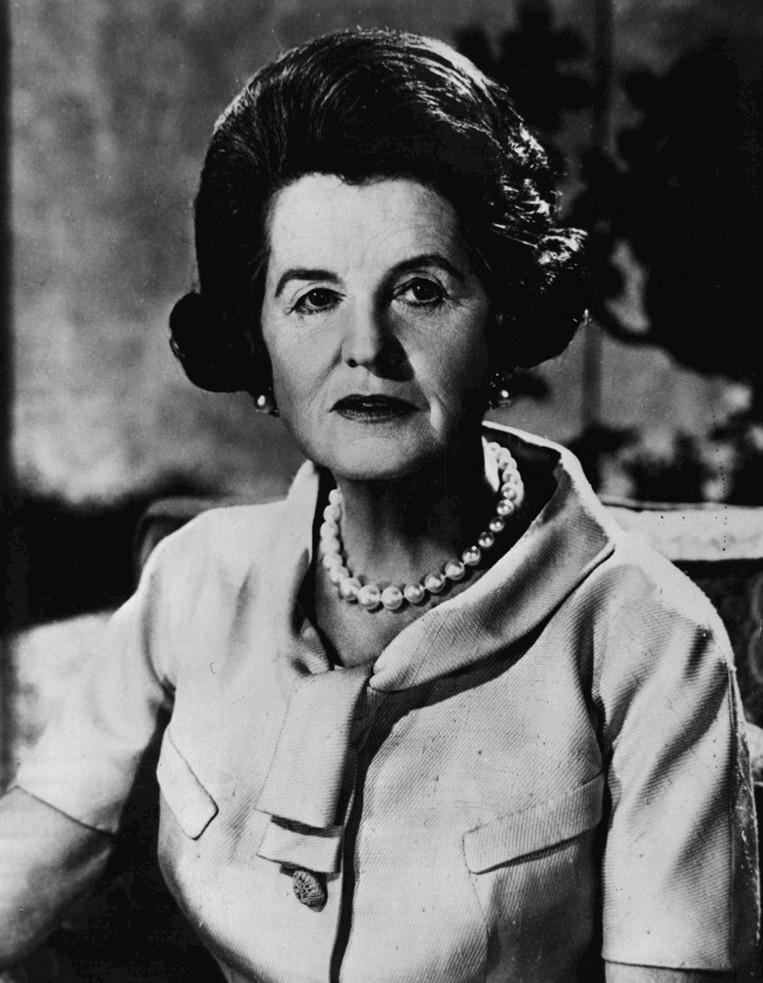
- Kennedy in 1967
- Known for: Kennedy family matriarch
- Born: Rose Elizabeth Fitzgerald; July 22, 1890; Boston, Massachusetts, U.S.
- Died: January 22, 1995 (aged 104); Hyannis Port, Massachusetts, U.S.
- Buried: Holyhood Cemetery; Brookline, Massachusetts, U.S.
- Spouse: Joseph P. Kennedy Sr. (m. 1914; died 1969)
- Children: Joseph Jr.; John; Rose; Kathleen; Eunice; Patricia; Robert; Jean; Edward
- Parents: John Francis Fitzgerald; Mary Josephine Hannon

Rose Elizabeth Fitzgerald Kennedy (July 22, 1890 – January 22, 1995) was an American philanthropist, socialite, and matriarch of the Kennedy family. She was deeply embedded in the "lace curtain" Irish-American community in Boston. Her father, John F. Fitzgerald, served in the Massachusetts State Senate (1892–1894), in the U.S. House of Representatives (1895–1901, 1919), and as Mayor of Boston (1906–1908, 1910–1914). Her husband, Joseph P. Kennedy Sr., chaired the U.S. Securities and Exchange Commission (1934–1935) and the U.S. Maritime Commission (1937–1938), and served as United States Ambassador to the United Kingdom (1938–1940). Their nine children included United States president John F. Kennedy, U.S. senator Robert F. Kennedy of New York, U.S. senator Ted Kennedy of Massachusetts, Special Olympics founder Eunice Kennedy Shriver, and U.S. Ambassador to Ireland Jean Kennedy Smith. In 1951, Rose Kennedy was ennobled by Pope Pius XII, becoming the sixth American woman to be granted the rank of papal countess.

== Early life ==
Rose Elizabeth Fitzgerald was born on July 22, 1890, at 4 Garden Court in the North End neighborhood of Boston, Massachusetts. She was the eldest of six children born to John Francis "Honey Fitz" Fitzgerald, at the time a member of the Boston Common Council, and the former Mary Josephine "Josie" Hannon.

At age 7, she moved with her family to West Concord, Massachusetts, and in 1904, they moved again, into an Italianate/Mansard-style home in the Ashmont Hill section of Dorchester, Massachusetts. Rose studied at the Blumenthal Academy of the Sacred Heart in Vaals, Netherlands, and graduated from Dorchester High School in 1906. She also attended the New England Conservatory in Boston, where she studied piano. After being refused permission by her father to attend Wellesley College, Fitzgerald enrolled at the Manhattanville College of the Sacred Heart (as it was then known) in Manhattan, an institution that did not grant degrees at the time. Kennedy later said that her greatest regret was "not having gone to Wellesley College," saying that it was "something I have felt a little sad about all my life." However, Rose eventually grew fond of the convent school, saying that the religious training she received became the foundation of her life.

In 1908, Fitzgerald and her father embarked on a tour of Europe and had a private audience with Pope Pius X at the Vatican.

== Marriage and family life ==
Rose Kennedy with her firstborn child, Joseph Jr., c. 1919

In her teens, Rose became acquainted with her future husband, Joseph Patrick "Joe" Kennedy, whom she met while their families were vacationing at Old Orchard Beach in Maine. He was the elder son of businessman/politician Patrick Joseph "P.J." Kennedy (a political rival of "Honey Fitz") and Mary Augusta Hickey. Kennedy would go on to court Fitzgerald for more than seven years, much to her father's disapproval.

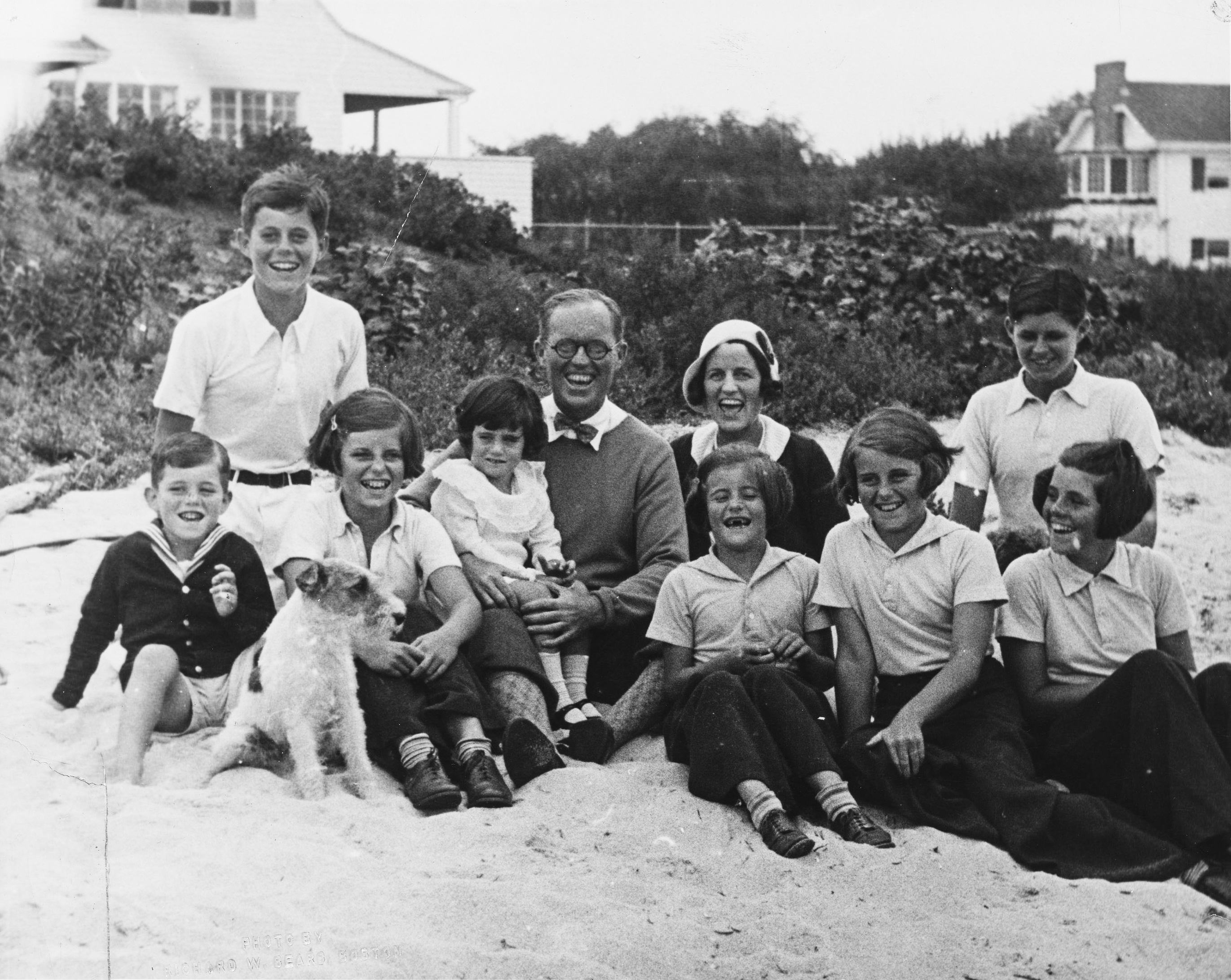
The Kennedy family at their Kennedy Compound home in Hyannis Port, Massachusetts, 1931. Rose Kennedy is seated next to her husband.

On October 7, 1914, at age 24, she married Kennedy in a modest ceremony at the small chapel of the residence of Archbishop William Henry O'Connell in Boston. They initially lived in a home in Brookline, Massachusetts, and later a 15-room cottage called Kennedy Compound at Hyannis Port, Massachusetts, on Cape Cod, which became the Kennedy family's lasting base. Their nine children were Joseph Jr. (1915–1944), John, called "Jack" (1917–1963), Rose Marie, called "Rosemary" (1918–2005), Kathleen, called "Kick" (1920–1948), Eunice (1921–2009), Patricia (1924–2006), Robert, called "Bobby" (1925–1968), Jean (1928–2020), and Edward, called "Ted" (1932–2009).

Joseph provided well for their family, but he was unfaithful. His affairs included one with Gloria Swanson. When Rose was eight months pregnant with the couple's fourth child, Kathleen, she temporarily went back to her parents, returning to Joseph after her father told her divorce was not an option. In turning a blind eye to her husband's affairs, Rose depended heavily on medication. Ronald Kessler found records for prescription tranquilizers Seconal, Placidyl, Librium, and Dalmane to relieve Rose's nervousness and stress and Lomotil, Bentyl, Librax, and Tagamet for her stomach. According to historian Doris Kearns Goodwin, "Rose knew what was going on, but, in my judgment, she willed that knowledge out of her mind. She didn’t want to lose her marriage. She didn’t want to lose her husband. She didn’t want to lose that family that she had created. It mattered too much to her. And I think, underneath, she knew Joe didn’t want to lose it, either."

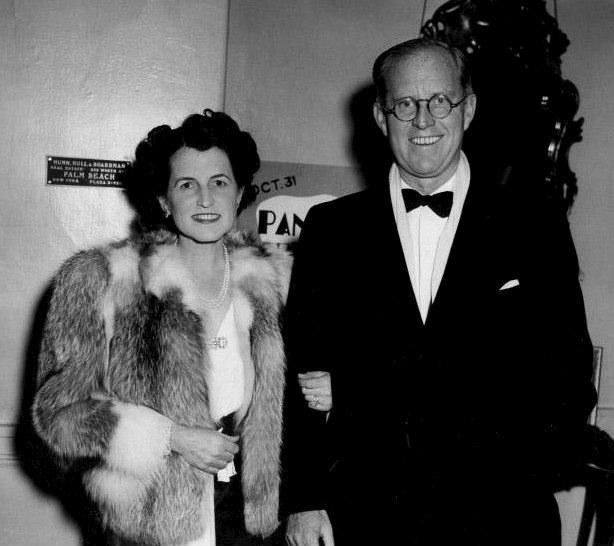
Rose Kennedy (left) and Joseph P. Kennedy Sr. in 1940

Rose Kennedy was a strict Catholic throughout her life. Even after her 100th birthday, she rarely missed Sunday Mass and maintained an "extremely prudish" exterior. Jacqueline Kennedy described her mother-in-law in her correspondence to Father Joseph Leonard, an Irish priest: "I don't think Jack's mother is too bright – and she would rather say a rosary than read a book."

Kennedy stated that she felt completely fulfilled as a full-time homemaker. In her 1974 autobiography, Times to Remember, she wrote, "I looked on child rearing not only as a work of love and duty but as a profession that was fully as interesting and challenging as any honorable profession in the world and one that demanded the best I could bring to it..... What greater aspiration and challenge are there for a mother than the hope of raising a great son or daughter?" According to one of her servants, Frank Saunders, she was self-centered, stingy, prudish, and often spiteful.

== Later years and death ==
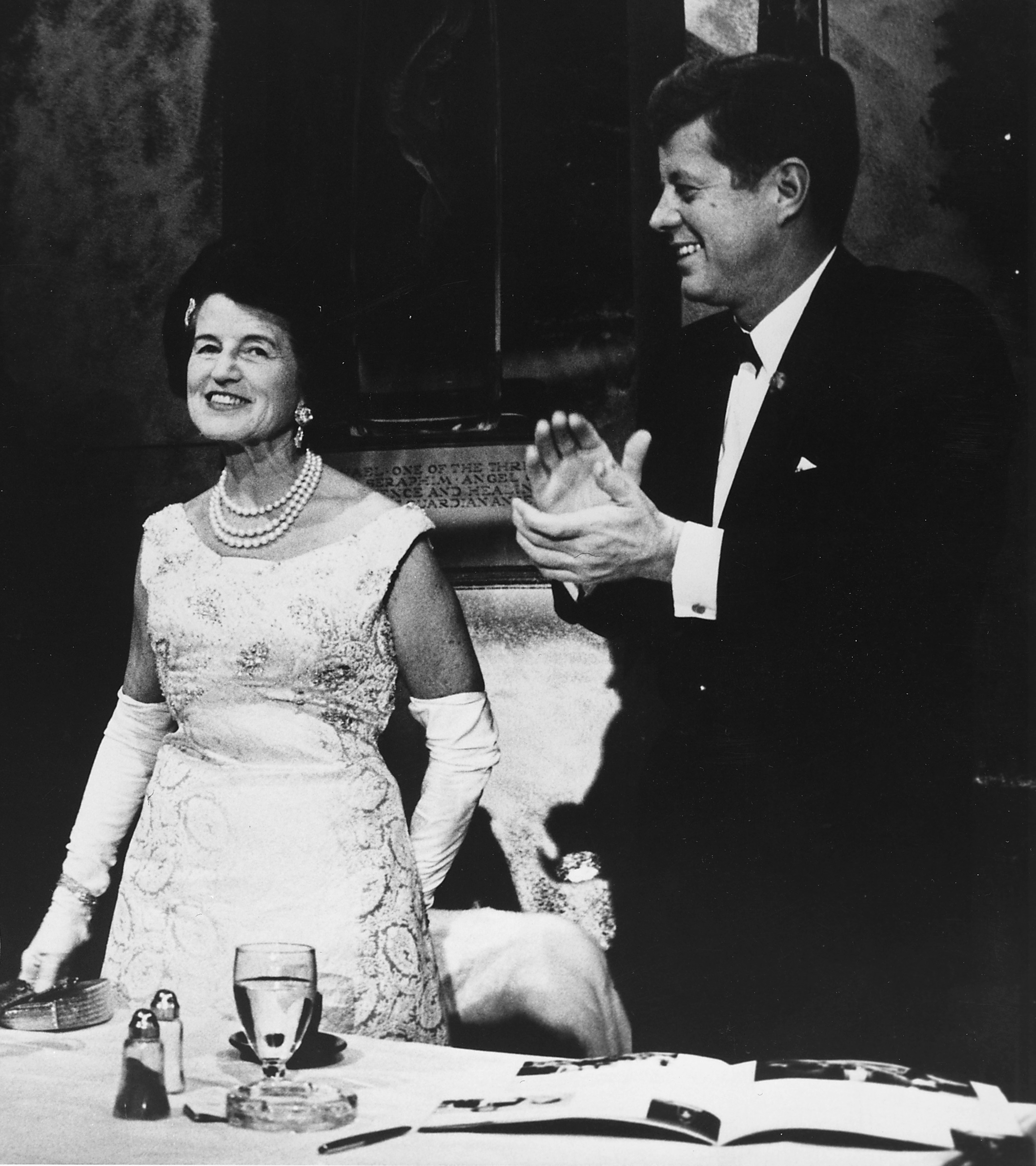
Kennedy (left) with her son, President John F. Kennedy in 1962

Rose campaigned for her sons John, Robert, and Edward from 1946 to 1976 in their political races for the United States House of Representatives, the United States Senate, and the presidency. In addition to being asked to attend and speak at events, she was increasingly asked to give interviews for television and books and to write articles about her life, her family, or her faith. Pierre Salinger once noted that Rose made prospective voters feel more important by preparing her remarks carefully and addressing them on intimate terms. Following John's election for president in 1960, Rose "became a sort of quiet celebrity" and appeared on the International Best Dressed List.

After suffering a stroke in 1984, she used a wheelchair for the remaining 11 years of her life. Kennedy maintained her residence at the Kennedy Compound in Hyannis Port and was cared for by private nurses and staff. She turned 100 years old on July 22, 1990. Kennedy died from complications of pneumonia at the Kennedy Compound, on January 22, 1995, at age 104, having outlived four of her nine children.

== Legacy ==
In 1951, Pope Pius XII granted Kennedy the title of countess in recognition of her "exemplary motherhood and many charitable works". In 1992, when she turned 102, the intersection of Welles Avenue and Harley Street in Boston was proclaimed "Rose Fitzgerald Kennedy Square". The plaque was dedicated by her son Senator Ted Kennedy. Also, the Rose Kennedy Greenway in Boston – the park that got created when the city's Central Artery was sunk below ground level in the "Big Dig" – was named after her on July 26, 2004. Well-known for her philanthropic efforts and for leading the Grandparents' Parade at age 90 at the Special Olympics, Kennedy's life and work are documented in the Oscar-nominated short documentary Rose Kennedy: A Life to Remember. She was a lifelong autograph collector.

The Rose Fitzgerald Kennedy Bridge in Ireland is named after her. As of its 2020 opening, it is the longest bridge in Ireland.

== Written works ==
- Kennedy, Rose Fitzgerald (1974). Times To Remember. Doubleday and Company. ISBN 9780385016254.
- Kennedy, Rose Fitzgerald (1995). Times To Remember. Doubleday and Company. ISBN 978-0-38547-657-7.
