= Patricia Kennedy Lawford =

American socialite (1924–2006)

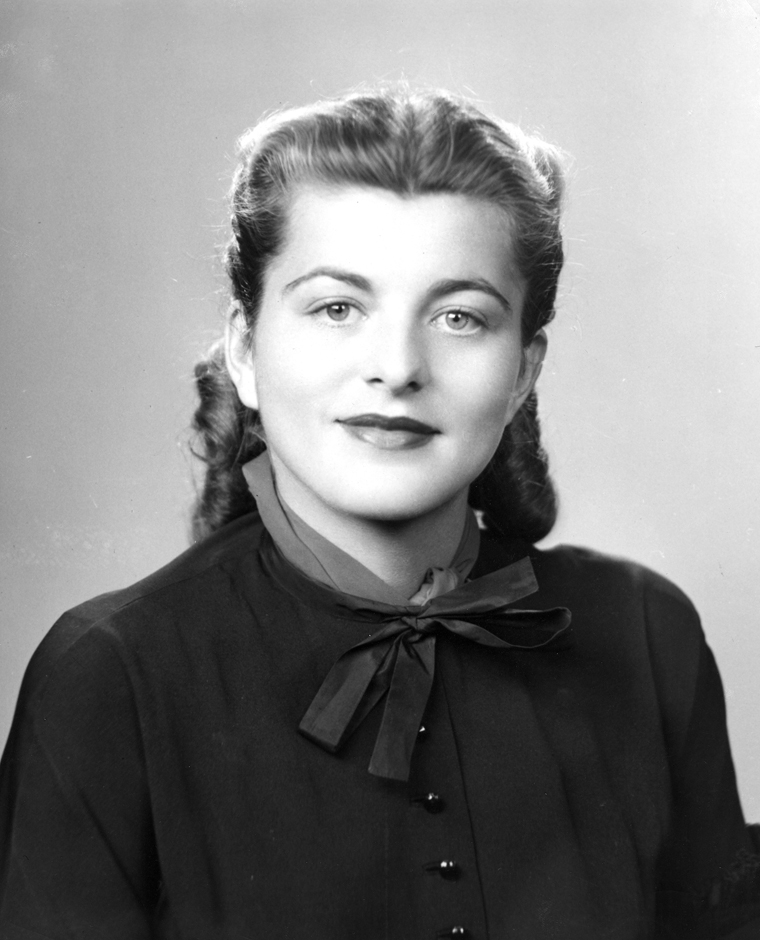
- Born: Patricia Helen Kennedy; May 6, 1924; Brookline, Massachusetts, U.S.
- Died: September 17, 2006 (aged 82); New York City, U.S.
- Burial place: Southampton Cemetery
- Education: Rosemont College
- Spouse: Peter Lawford (m. 1954; div. 1966)
- Children: 4, including Christopher
- Parents: Joseph P. Kennedy Sr.; Rose Kennedy
- Family: Kennedy family

Patricia Helen Lawford (née Kennedy; May 6, 1924 – September 17, 2006) was an American socialite. She was a sister of President John F. Kennedy, Senator Robert F. Kennedy, and Senator Ted Kennedy, as well as a sister-in-law of Jacqueline Kennedy Onassis. Patricia wanted to be a film producer, a profession not readily open to young women in her time. She married English actor Peter Lawford in 1954, but they divorced in 1966.

== Early life ==
Patricia Helen Kennedy was born on May 6, 1924, in Brookline, Massachusetts. She attended Roehampton Sacred Heart Convent School (now Woldingham School) in London, and Maplehurst Sacred Heart Convent School in Bronxville, New York. In 1945, she received a bachelor of arts degree from Rosemont College, where she was active in both directing and acting in theatrical productions.

She was considered the most sophisticated, yet also the most introverted, of her parents' five daughters. Since childhood she had a fascination with travel and Hollywood. In time, she would become a world traveler, so much so that, as a young girl, she was given assignments by the independent and foreign press to write of her travels. Her ongoing fascination with Hollywood was fueled by her father's stories and adventures there as a movie mogul heading RKO Pictures. After graduating from Rosemont College, she decided to pursue her interest in theatrical activities.

== Career ==
Her father apparently believed that she could do as much, once saying, "Pat is the one with head for business. She could really run this town if she put her mind to it."

She began working as an assistant in NBC's New York production department. She then moved to Hollywood to work as an assistant for singer Kate Smith's radio program, and later for Father Peyton's Family Rosary Crusade. When she was 22 years old, Patricia was the producer of I Love to Eat, on NBC-TV; it was the first cooking program on network television.

In her youth, Patricia befriended RMS Titanic survivor Edith Rosenbaum, and made Rosenbaum godmother to her children.

=== Political involvement ===
In addition to her work in show business, Patricia was a tireless supporter of her brothers' political campaigns. For John's congressional race in 1946, she and her sisters and mother held a number of "tea parties" around Boston in which they discussed John's boyhood and his World War II experience. During the 1960 presidential campaign, Patricia traveled around the country speaking on her brother’s behalf, and she would later play an active role in the presidential races of her brothers Robert and Ted.

== Personal life ==
She met English actor Peter Lawford through her brother John in 1949. They courted briefly, and officially announced their engagement in February 1954. They married on April 24, 1954, (Note: Her page on the website of the John F. Kennedy Presidential Library and Museum says that she and Lawford married on April 23, 1954.) at St. Thomas More Church in New York City. They settled in Santa Monica, California, and had four children, including Christopher Lawford (1955–2018). Patricia and Peter (who was a member of Frank Sinatra's "Rat Pack") held lavish parties at their Malibu mansion during the 1950s and early 1960s with guests such as Marilyn Monroe.

Despite the glamorous persona Lawford presented, their relationship suffered strains as early as their brief engagement. Lawford had difficulty adjusting to Kennedy's steadfast Catholicism and her family's larger-than-life image. Kennedy could not tolerate Lawford's heavy drinking, extramarital affairs, and gradual addiction to drugs. Shortly after her brother John was assassinated in 1963, she filed for a legal separation, and the couple officially divorced in February 1966.

== Later years ==
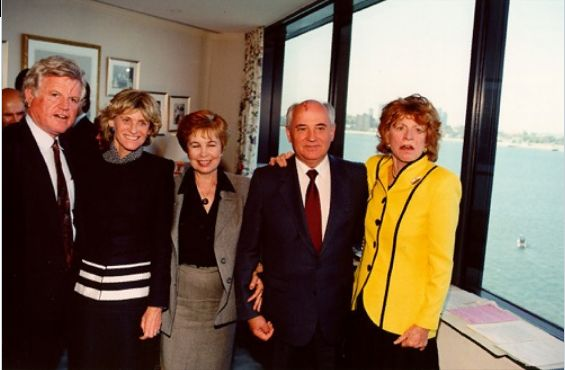
With Lawford (far right) are Senator Ted Kennedy, Jean Kennedy Smith, Raisa Gorbachyova, and Mikhail Gorbachev.

After her divorce, Kennedy battled alcoholism, and suffered from tongue cancer. She worked with the John F. Kennedy Library and Museum, as well as with the National Center on Addiction, and was a founder of the National Committee for the Literary Arts, for which she arranged a series of author lectures and scholarships.

== Death ==
Kennedy died of pneumonia aged 82 on September 17, 2006, in her Manhattan home. She is buried in Southampton Cemetery.

== See also ==
- Kennedy family
