= Joseph P. Kennedy Sr. =

American businessman and politician (1888–1969)

Joseph P. Kennedy
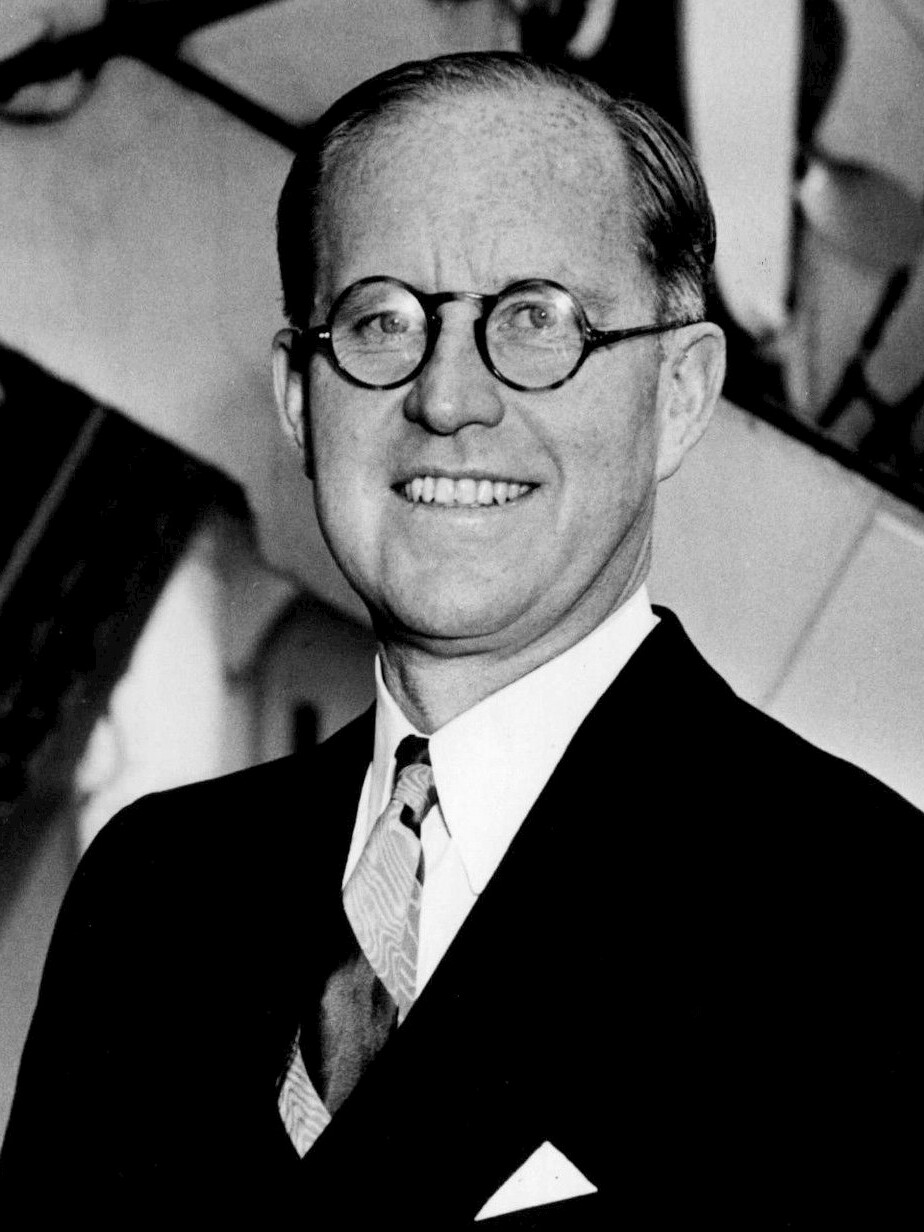
- Kennedy in 1938

44th United States Ambassador to the United Kingdom
- In office March 8, 1938 – October 22, 1940
- President: Franklin D. Roosevelt
- Preceded by: Robert Worth Bingham
- Succeeded by: John Gilbert Winant

1st Chair of the United States Maritime Commission
- In office April 14, 1937 – February 19, 1938
- President: Franklin D. Roosevelt
- Preceded by: Position established
- Succeeded by: Emory S. Land

1st Chair of the United States Securities and Exchange Commission
- In office June 30, 1934 – September 23, 1935
- President: Franklin D. Roosevelt
- Preceded by: Position established
- Succeeded by: James M. Landis

Personal details
- Born: Joseph Patrick Kennedy; September 6, 1888 Boston, Massachusetts, U.S.
- Died: November 18, 1969 (aged 81) Hyannis Port, Massachusetts, U.S.
- Resting place: Holyhood Cemetery
- Party: Democratic
- Spouse: Rose Fitzgerald (m. 1914)
- Children: Joseph Jr.; John; Rose; Kathleen; Eunice; Patricia; Robert; Jean; Edward
- Parents: P. J. Kennedy; Mary Augusta Hickey
- Relatives: Kennedy family
- Education: Harvard University (AB)
- Occupation: Businessman; investor; philanthropist; politician

Joseph Patrick Kennedy Sr. (September 6, 1888 – November 18, 1969) was an American businessman, investor, philanthropist, and politician. Known for his own political prominence as well as that of his children, he was the patriarch of the Kennedy family.

Kennedy was born into a political family in East Boston, Massachusetts. After making a large fortune as a stock and commodity market investor, he invested in the film industry, real estate and other lines of business. During World War I, he was an assistant general manager of a Boston area Bethlehem Steel shipyard; through that position, he became acquainted with Franklin D. Roosevelt, who was the Assistant Secretary of the Navy. In the 1920s, Kennedy made huge profits by reorganizing and refinancing several Hollywood studios; several acquisitions were ultimately merged into Radio-Keith-Orpheum (RKO) studios. Kennedy increased his fortune with distribution rights for Scotch whisky. He owned the largest privately owned building in the country, Chicago's Merchandise Mart.

Kennedy was a leading member of the Democratic Party and of the Irish Catholic community. President Roosevelt appointed Kennedy to be the first chairman of the Securities and Exchange Commission (SEC), which he led from 1934 to 1935. Kennedy later directed the United States Maritime Commission. He served as the United States Ambassador to the United Kingdom from 1938 to late 1940. With the outbreak of World War II in September 1939, Kennedy was pessimistic about Britain's ability to survive attacks from Germany. During the Battle of Britain in November 1940, Kennedy publicly suggested, "Democracy is finished in England. It may be here [in the United States]." After a controversy regarding this statement, Kennedy resigned his position.

Kennedy married Rose Fitzgerald and had nine children. During his later life, he was heavily involved in the political careers of his sons. Three of Kennedy's sons attained distinguished political positions: John F. Kennedy served as a U.S. senator from Massachusetts and as the 35th president of the United States, Robert F. Kennedy served as the U.S. attorney general and as a U.S. senator from New York, and Ted Kennedy was a U.S. senator from Massachusetts. Kennedy was also the father of Special Olympics founder Eunice Kennedy Shriver and U.S. Ambassador to Ireland Jean Kennedy Smith.

== Early life and education ==
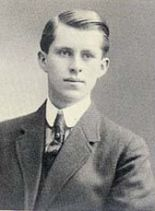
Kennedy's yearbook photo from Boston Latin School

Joseph Patrick Kennedy Sr. was born on September 6, 1888, at 151 Meridian Street in East Boston, Massachusetts. Kennedy was the elder son of Mary Augusta (née Hickey) Kennedy and businessman and politician Patrick Joseph "P.J." Kennedy. Kennedy attended Boston Latin School, where he excelled at baseball and was elected class president before graduating in 1908.

Kennedy then attended Harvard College, where he gained admittance to the prestigious Hasty Pudding Club but was not invited to join the Porcellian Club. Kennedy graduated in 1912 with a bachelor's degree in economics.

== Business career ==
Kennedy set his future sights on embarking on a business career upon his graduation from Harvard. During his mid-to-late 20s, he became a bank examiner and commodity and stock investor. He reinvested much of his proceeds into the film industry, real estate, and shipping lines. When Fortune magazine published its first list of the richest people in the United States in 1957, it placed Kennedy in the $200–400 million group, equivalent to about $3.2 billion in 2023.

=== Early ventures ===
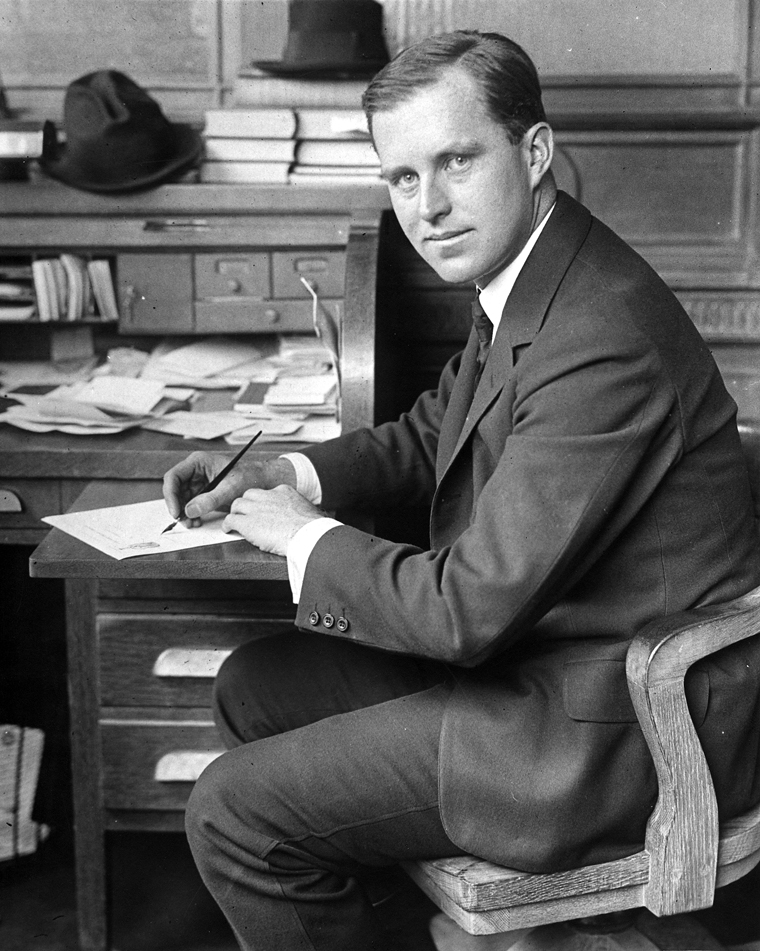
Kennedy in 1914, aged 25, after becoming president of Columbia Trust Bank

Kennedy's first job after graduating from Harvard was a position as a bank clerk, and later a bank examiner at Columbia Trust Bank. This job allowed him to learn a great deal about the banking industry. In 1913, the Columbia Trust Bank, in which his father held a significant share, was under threat of takeover. Kennedy borrowed $45,000 (equivalent to $1.5 million in 2025) from family and friends and bought back control. At the age of 25, he was rewarded by being elected the bank's president. Kennedy told the press he was "the youngest" bank president in America. In May 1917, Kennedy was elected to the Board of Trustees of the Massachusetts Electric Company, New England's leading public utility at the time.

Although he was skeptical of American involvement in World War I, Kennedy sought to participate in wartime production as an assistant general manager of Fore River, a major Bethlehem Steel shipyard in Quincy, Massachusetts. There, he oversaw the production of transports and warships. Through this job, he became acquainted with Assistant Secretary of the Navy Franklin D. Roosevelt.

=== Wall Street and stock market investments ===
In 1919, Kennedy joined Hayden, Stone & Co., a prominent stock brokerage firm with offices in Boston and New York, where he became an expert dealing in the unregulated stock market of the day, engaging in tactics that were later considered to be insider trading and market manipulation violations. He happened to be on the corner of Wall and Broad Streets at the moment of the Wall Street bombing on September 16, 1920, and was thrown to the ground by the force of the blast. In 1923, he established his own investment company. Kennedy subsequently became a multi-millionaire as a result of taking "short" positions following the 1929 stock market crash.

Kennedy was enlisted in 1924 to help stabilize the stock of John D. Hertz's Yellow Cab Company, a taxi cab operator, against a bear raid; afterward, Hertz suspected Kennedy of carrying out such a raid against the stock himself. In 1933, he helped establish a "stock pool" that bought large quantities of stock in Libbey-Owens-Ford (LOF), an auto-glass manufacturer, and wash-traded huge volumes of stock among themselves while promoting the outright fraud that their company was related to Owens-Illinois, a glassmaker that made bottles which presumably would have profited from the imminent repeal of Prohibition.

==== 1929 Wall Street Crash ====
Kennedy later claimed he understood that the rampant stock speculation of the late 1920s would lead to a market crash. It is said that he knew it was time to get out of the market when he received stock tips from a shoe-shine boy, but no evidence has been found of the anecdote and the first known version of the same tale was associated to Bernard Baruch in 1957. Kennedy survived the crash "because he possessed a passion for facts, a complete lack of sentiment and a marvelous sense of timing".

During the Great Depression, Kennedy shrewdly increased his wealth by devoting most of it to investment-grade real estate. In 1929, Kennedy's fortune was estimated to be $4 million (equivalent to $75 million in 2025). By 1935, his wealth had increased to $180 million (equivalent to $4.23 billion in 2025). He also acquired enough capital to establish million-dollar trust funds for each of his nine children that guaranteed lifelong financial independence.

=== Investments ===
==== Hollywood ====
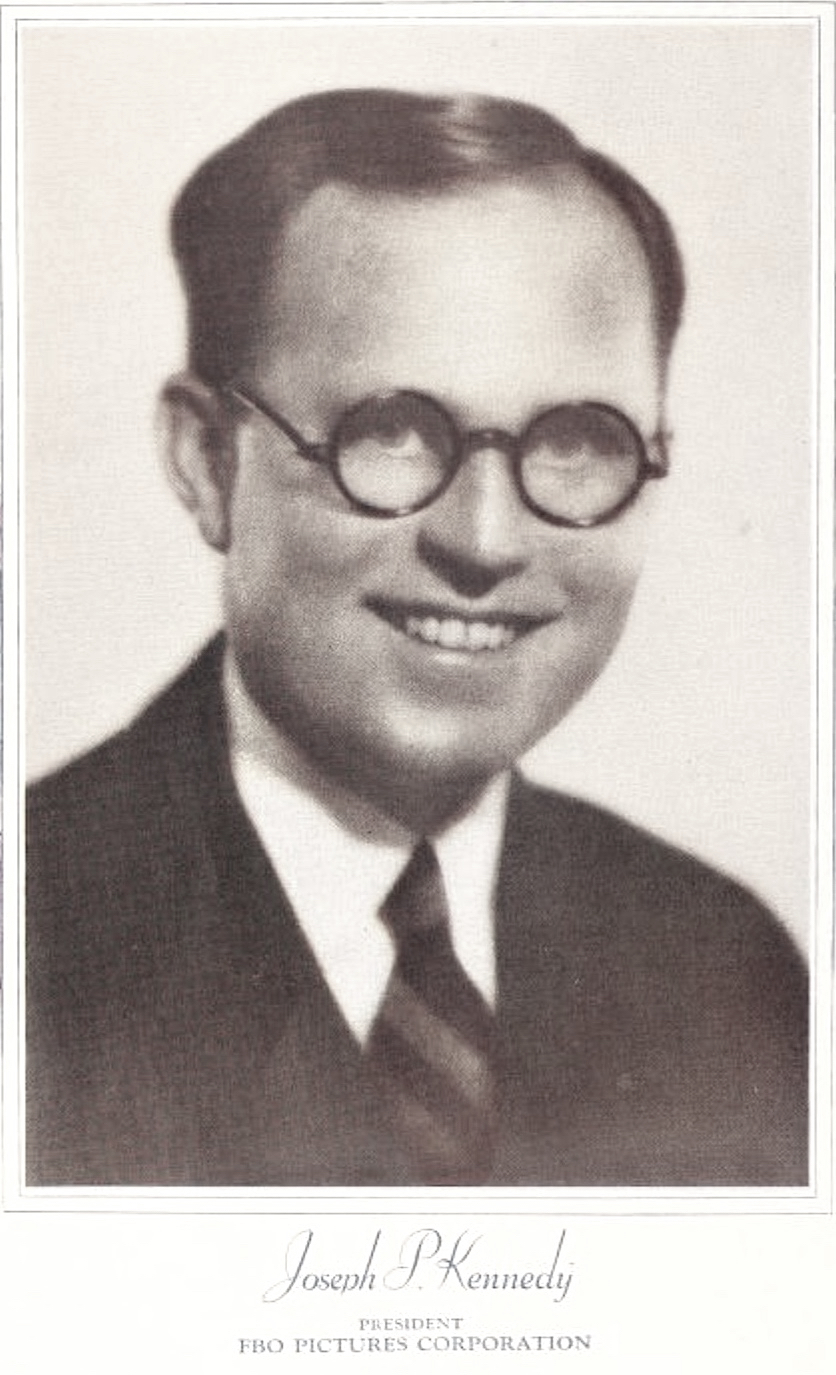
Studio photo of Kennedy as part of trade paper advertisement promoting Film Booking Offices of America's forthcoming attractions, May 1928

Kennedy generated windfall profits from reorganizing and refinancing several Hollywood film studios. He began with film distribution in New England, buying first movie theaters in Massachusetts, but quickly moved on to industry-wide arrangements and production. While still at Hayden, Stone & Co., Kennedy boasted to a colleague, "Look at that bunch of pants pressers in Hollywood making themselves millionaires. I could take the whole business away from them." One small studio, Film Booking Offices of America (FBO), specialized in Westerns produced cheaply. Its owner was in financial trouble, and asked Kennedy to help find a new owner. Kennedy formed his own group of investors and bought it for $1.5 million.

In March 1926, Kennedy moved to Hollywood to focus on running film studios. At that time, film studios were permitted to own exhibition companies, which were necessary to get their films on local screens. With that in mind, he bought controlling shares in Keith-Albee-Orpheum Theaters Corporation (KAO), which had more than 700 vaudeville theaters across the United States that had begun showing movies. In October 1928, he formally merged his film companies FBO and KAO to form Radio-Keith-Orpheum (RKO) and made a large amount of money in the process. Kennedy had no interest in vaudeville; he just wanted the theaters, which he planned to convert to movie houses for the film booking interests he ran in cooperation with Radio Corporation of America (RCA). As the developer of photophone, a sound system for the new "talkies", RCA needed to forge a connection with Hollywood to sell its product. At the same time Kennedy knew that he needed to compete in the new market of sound films and to do so he would have to have access to a technology that was not proprietary.

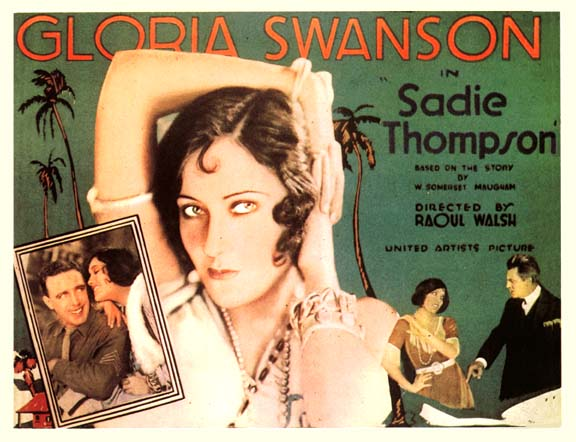
Kennedy, along with fifteen others, signed a telegram warning that the release of Sadie Thompson starring Gloria Swanson would jeopardize the ability of the film industry to censor itself. Swanson needed financing for her film production company, and Kennedy began a three-year affair with her when he met her for lunch in New York after the film's release.

Keen to buy the Pantages Theatre chain, which had 63 profitable theaters, Kennedy made an offer of $8 million (equivalent to $150.0 million in 2025). It was declined. He then stopped distributing his movies to Pantages. Still, Alexander Pantages declined to sell. However, when Pantages was later charged and tried for rape, his reputation took a battering, and he accepted Kennedy's revised offer of $3.5 million (equivalent to $65.6 million in 2025). Pantages, who claimed that Kennedy had "set him up", was later found not guilty at a second trial. The girl who had accused Pantages of rape, Eunice Pringle, was rumored to have confessed on her deathbed that Kennedy was the mastermind of the plot to frame Pantages. This rumor was later debunked by Pringle's daughter, Mary Worthington. Kennedy made over $5 million (equivalent to $93.8 million in 2025) from his investments in Hollywood. During his three-year affair with film star Gloria Swanson, he arranged the financing for her films The Love of Sunya (1927) and the ill-fated Queen Kelly (1928). The duo also used Hollywood's famous "body sculptor", masseuse Sylvia of Hollywood. Their relationship ended when Swanson discovered that an expensive gift from Kennedy had actually been charged to her account.

==== Liquor importing ====
Kennedy ventured into aspects of the legal liquor business during Prohibition in the United States. As soon as it became legal to do so, Kennedy ventured into liquor importing. One of the shipping ventures he was involved in was the importation of large shipments of high-priced Scotch whisky where he earned a handsome profit in the process. Various contradictory "bootlegging" stories surrounding Kennedy have circulated but historians have not accepted them. At the start of the Franklin Roosevelt administration in March 1933, Kennedy and future Congressman James Roosevelt II obtained the exclusive rights to import some alcoholic beverage brands to the United States from Great Britain, before Prohibition ended, and later founded Somerset Importers, a business entity that acted as the exclusive American agent for Haig & Haig Scotch, Gordon's Dry Gin, Dewar's Scotch, King William IV Scotch Whisky, and Riondo Puerto Rico Rum, and other imported drinks. Kennedy kept his Somerset company for years. In addition, Kennedy purchased spirits-importation rights from Schenley Industries, a New York City liquor company with a Canadian distillery. Though he possessed substantial investments in various shipping lines that imported significant shipments of liquor, Kennedy himself drank little alcohol. He so disapproved of what he considered a stereotypical Irish vice that he offered his sons $1,000 not to drink until they turned 21.

After Kennedy's death, various criminals, such as Frank Costello, boasted that they worked with Kennedy in bootlegging operations during Prohibition. The most recent biographer David Nasaw claims that no credible evidence has been found to link Kennedy to bootlegging activities. When asked about it during a public discussion held by the CUNY Graduate Center on his biography of Kennedy, Nasaw said:

What I found was that I went through every parcel of evidence, and anyone who had ever written he was a bootlegger, and I looked at their footnotes, I looked at their sources, I looked at what they had to say on the page. And I discovered, number one; that nobody calls him a bootlegger until the '70s. The Nixon people do everything they possibly can during the 1960 election to smash Joe Kennedy, and they call him everything but a bootlegger. It just doesn't come up. In the 70s, the conspiracy hunters, trying to connect him to the Mafia and the Mafia to the assassination, develop the bootlegger thesis. So I went back and I looked at the sources. The sources are Al Capone's piano tuner. These are the major sources. I'm not making this up. Al Capone's piano tuner, who claims that he overheard a conversation between Capone and Kennedy. Sam Giancana's nephew and half-brother, who write a book, and his daughter, who writes another book. Murray Humphreys', who's big in the Chicago Mafia, estranged wife. And Tina Sinatra. Is it Tina that? Yeah, Tina Sinatra. These are the sources. And they all report third hand. You know, "My dad told me that so-and-so said this." There's no evidence there. I would've been delighted, by the way, if there were. It would've made for a richer book. I could've talked about Momo and the Mafia, but there was no evidence there whatsoever.

==== Real estate ====
Kennedy reinvested the proceeds he made from liquor importing into various residential and commercial real estate ventures, much of it concentrated in New York City, and the Hialeah Park Race Track in Hialeah, Florida. The most important purchase of his real estate investment career was marked by the land acquisition of the largest privately owned building in the country, Chicago's Merchandise Mart (the world's largest building at the time), which gave his family an important base in that city and an alliance with the Irish-American political leadership there to lay the groundwork for realizing his sons' future political ambitions. The Merchandise Mart's revenues became a principal source of wealth that formed much of the Kennedy family's private fortune, including being a source of funding for financing his sons' future political campaigns.

== Political career ==
=== SEC Chairman (1934–1935) ===
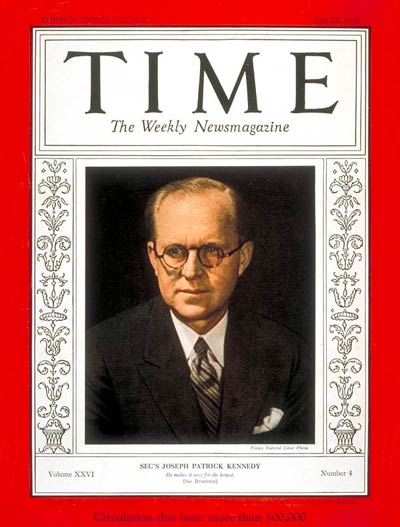
Kennedy on Time magazine cover, 1935

In 1932, Kennedy supported Franklin D. Roosevelt in his bid for the presidency. This was his first major involvement in a national political campaign, and he donated, lent, and raised a substantial amount of money for the campaign.

In 1934, Congress established the independent Securities and Exchange Commission (SEC) to end irresponsible market manipulations and dissemination of false information about securities. Roosevelt's brain trust drew up a list of recommended candidates for the SEC chairmanship. Kennedy headed the list, which stated he was "the best bet for Chairman because of executive ability, knowledge of habits and customs of business to be regulated and ability to moderate different points of view on Commission."

In his address to the Boston Chamber of Commerce on November 15, 1934, Kennedy said, "Deplorable loss was the consequence of ill-considered conception, preparation, and execution. We don't want the staccato tempo of much of the frenzied financing of the late twenties." Kennedy continued, "We have the tremendous task of educating the American public to protect itself against high-pressure salesmanship. No law has ever been devised or administered which successfully eradicated crookedness. The Federal Government, however, hopes to fill a much needed want, hopes to be a vigorous factor in the relentless war on stock frauds."

Kennedy sought out the best lawyers available, giving him a hard-driving team with a mission for reform. Notably, he selected William O. Douglas and Abe Fortas, both of whom were later appointed to the Supreme Court. Douglas eventually became SEC Chairman in 1937. The SEC had four missions. First was to restore investor confidence in the securities market, which had collapsed on account of its questionability, and the external threats supposedly posed by anti-business elements in the Roosevelt administration. Second, the SEC had to get rid of penny-ante swindles based on false information, fraudulent devices, and get-rich-quick schemes. Thirdly, and much more important than the frauds, the SEC had to end the million-dollar maneuvers in major corporations, whereby insiders with access to high-quality information about the company knew when to buy or sell their own securities. A crackdown on insider trading was essential. Finally, the SEC had to set up a complex system of registration for all securities sold in America, with a clear set of rules, deadlines and guidelines that all companies had to follow. The main challenge faced by the young lawyers was drafting precise rules. The SEC succeeded in its four missions, as Kennedy reassured the American business community that they would no longer be deceived and taken advantage of by Wall Street. He trumpeted for ordinary investors to return to the market and enable the economy to grow again. Kennedy's reforming work as SEC Chairman was widely praised on all sides, as investors realized the SEC was protecting their interests. He resigned from the SEC in September 1935.

=== Chairman of U.S. Maritime Commission (1937–1938) ===
In 1936, Roosevelt sought Kennedy's help on the campaign, and Kennedy responded with his book I'm for Roosevelt, which he had published and made sure was widely distributed. The book presented arguments for why businessmen should support Roosevelt and the New Deal, told from the perspective of Kennedy's own personal endorsement. The book had significant impact in the business community and after his re-election, Roosevelt appointed Kennedy as Chairman of the United States Maritime Commission, which built on his wartime experience in running a major shipyard. Kennedy spent only ten months at the commission.

=== Relationship with Father Charles Coughlin ===
Father Charles Coughlin, an Irish Canadian priest near Detroit, became the most prominent Roman Catholic spokesman on political and financial issues in the 1930s, with a radio audience in the millions every week. Having been a strong supporter of Roosevelt since 1932, in 1934 Coughlin broke with the president, who became a bitter opponent and a target of Coughlin's weekly anti-communist, anti-Semitic, far-right, anti–Federal Reserve and isolationist radio talks. Roosevelt sent Kennedy and other prominent Irish Catholics to try to tone down Coughlin.

Coughlin swung his support to Huey Long in 1935, and then to William Lemke's Union Party in 1936. Kennedy strongly supported the New Deal (Father Coughlin believed that the New Deal did not go far enough, and thought that Franklin Roosevelt was a tool of the rich) and reportedly believed as early as 1933 that Coughlin was "becoming a very dangerous proposition" as an opponent of Roosevelt and "an out and out demagogue". In 1936, Kennedy worked with Roosevelt, Bishop Francis Spellman and Cardinal Eugenio Pacelli (later Pope Pius XII) to shut Coughlin down. When Coughlin returned to the air in 1940, Kennedy continued to battle against his influence among Irish Americans.

Despite his public disputes with Coughlin, it has also been acknowledged that Kennedy would also accompany Coughlin whenever the priest visited Roosevelt at Hyde Park. A historian with History News Network also stated that Coughlin was a friend of Kennedy as well. In a Boston Post article of August 16, 1936, Coughlin referred to Kennedy as the "shining star among the dim 'knights' in the [Roosevelt] Administration".

=== Ambassador to the United Kingdom (1938–1940) ===
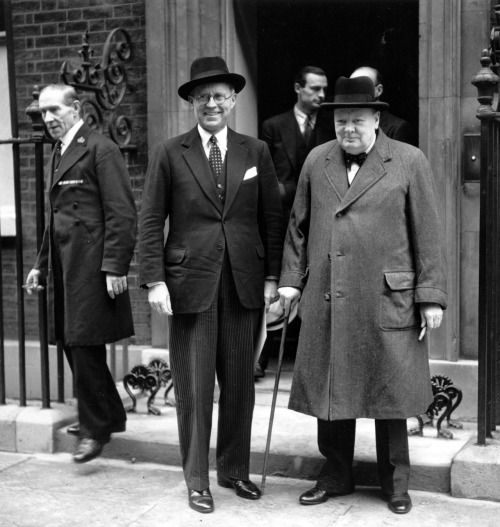
Ambassador Joseph Kennedy with Winston Churchill in London, 1939

In 1938, Roosevelt appointed Kennedy as the United States ambassador to the Court of St James's (United Kingdom). Kennedy hoped to succeed Roosevelt in the White House, telling a British reporter in late 1939 that he was confident that Roosevelt would "fall" in 1940 (that year's presidential election).

Kennedy and his family retreated to the countryside during the bombings of London by German aircraft in World War II. In so doing, he damaged his reputation with the British. This move prompted Randolph Churchill to say, "I thought my daffodils were yellow until I met Joe Kennedy".

Kennedy developed a reputation as a defeatist. His pessimism on the prospect of a feared German invasion of England was evidenced by the U.S. Embassy advice on May 17, 1940, to the 4000 Americans then living in Britain to return home "as soon as possible." A sterner message in June warned "that this may be the last opportunity for Americans to get home until after the war." Many Americans chose to remain, and on June 1, 1940, the 1st American Squadron of the Home Guard was formed in London. They had average strength of 60–70 people, and were commanded by General Wade H. Hayes. Kennedy opposed the mustering of citizens from a then-neutral power, fearing that in the event of invasion, a civilian squadron would make all U.S. citizens living in London liable to be shot by the invading Germans as francs-tireurs.

==== High society ====
According to the U.S. National Archives:

In London, the American Ambassador and his wife soared to the heights of British society. In the spring of 1938...the couple luxuriated in the warmth of English hospitality, hobnobbing with aristocrats and royalty at the many balls, dinners, regattas, and derbies of the season. The highlight was surely the April weekend that they spent at Windsor Castle, guests of King George VI and his wife, Queen Elizabeth.

While getting dressed for an evening at Windsor Castle soon after he arrived, Kennedy paused in momentary reflection and remarked to his wife, "Well, Rose, this is a helluva long way from East Boston, isn't it?"

On May 6, 1944, Kennedy's daughter, Kathleen, married William Cavendish, Marquess of Hartington, the elder son of the Duke of Devonshire. The union was disapproved by Rose Kennedy due to Hartington being an Anglican. Unable to reconcile their religious backgrounds, Hartington and Kathleen were married in a civil ceremony. Hartington, a major in the Coldstream Guards, was killed in action on September 9, 1944.

==== Appeasement ====
Kennedy rejected the belief of Winston Churchill that any compromise with Nazi Germany was impossible. Instead, he supported Prime Minister Neville Chamberlain's policy of appeasement. Throughout 1938, while the Nazi persecution of the Jews in Germany intensified, Kennedy attempted to arrange a meeting with Adolf Hitler. Shortly before the Nazi bombing of British cities began in September 1940, Kennedy once again sought a personal meeting with Hitler without the approval of the U. S. Department of State, in order to "bring about a better understanding between the United States and Germany".

==== Anti-British sentiment ====
When war came in September 1939, Kennedy's public support for American neutrality conflicted with Roosevelt's increasing efforts to provide aid to Britain. "Democracy is finished in England. It may be here [in the United States]", he stated in the Boston Sunday Globe of November 10, 1940. With German troops having overrun Poland, Denmark, Norway, Belgium, the Netherlands, Luxembourg, and France, and with daily bombings of Great Britain, Kennedy unambiguously and repeatedly stated that the war was not about saving democracy from Nazism or from Fascism. In an interview with two newspaper journalists, Louis M. Lyons of The Boston Globe, and Ralph Coghlan of the St. Louis Post-Dispatch, Kennedy said:

It's all a question of what we do with the next six months. The whole reason for aiding England is to give us time ... As long as she is in there, we have time to prepare. It isn't that [Britain is] fighting for democracy. That's the bunk. She's fighting for self-preservation, just as we will if it comes to us. ... I know more about the European situation than anybody else, and it's up to me to see that the country gets it.

==== Isolationism ====
Kennedy's views became inconsistent and increasingly isolationist. British MP Josiah Wedgwood IV, who had himself opposed the British government's earlier appeasement policy, said of Kennedy:

We have a rich man, untrained in diplomacy, unlearned in history and politics, who is a great publicity seeker and who apparently is ambitious to be the first Catholic president of the U.S.

==== Attitudes toward Jews and refugees ====
According to Harvey Klemmer, who served as one of Kennedy's embassy aides, Kennedy habitually referred to Jews as "kikes or sheenies". Kennedy allegedly told Klemmer that "[some] individual Jews are all right, Harvey, but as a race they stink. They spoil everything they touch." When Klemmer returned from a trip to Germany and reported the pattern of vandalism and assaults on Jews by Nazis, Kennedy responded, "Well, they brought it on themselves."

On June 13, 1938, Kennedy met in London with Herbert von Dirksen, the German ambassador to the United Kingdom, who claimed upon his return to Berlin that Kennedy had told him that "it was not so much the fact that we want to get rid of the Jews that was so harmful to us, but rather the loud clamor with which we accompanied this purpose. [Kennedy] himself fully understood our Jewish policy." Kennedy's main concern with such violent acts against German Jews as Kristallnacht was that they generated bad publicity in the West for the Nazi regime, a concern that he communicated in a letter to Charles Lindbergh.

Kennedy had a close friendship with Viscountess Astor, and their correspondence is replete with anti-Semitic statements. According to Edward Renehan:

As fiercely anti-Communist as they were anti-Semitic, Kennedy and Astor looked upon Adolf Hitler as a welcome solution to both of these "world problems" (Nancy's phrase). ... . Kennedy replied that he expected the "Jew media" in the United States to become a problem, that "Jewish pundits in New York and Los Angeles" were already making noises contrived to "set a match to the fuse of the world".

By August 1940, Kennedy worried that a third term for President Roosevelt would mean war. Biographer Laurence Leamer in The Kennedy Men: 1901–1963 reports: "Joe believed that Roosevelt, Churchill, the Jews, and their allies would manipulate America into approaching Armageddon." Nevertheless, Kennedy supported Roosevelt's third term in return for Roosevelt's promise to support Joseph Kennedy Jr. in a run for Governor of Massachusetts in 1942. However, even during the darkest months of World War II, Kennedy remained "more wary of" prominent American Jews, such as Associate Justice Felix Frankfurter, than he was of Hitler.

Kennedy told the reporter Joe Dinneen:

It is true that I have a low opinion of some Jews in public office and in private life. That does not mean that I. ... believe they should be wiped off the face of the Earth. ... Jews who take an unfair advantage of the fact that theirs is a persecuted race do not help much. ... Publicizing unjust attacks upon the Jews may help to cure the injustice, but continually publicizing the whole problem only serves to keep it alive in the public mind.

==== "The Kennedy Plan" to help Jewish refugees ====
In some cases, however, Kennedy proved more willing to help Jewish refugees than FDR. Shortly after Kristallnacht, he lent his name to a proposal by George Rublee the chair of the London-based Intergovernmental Committee on Refugees, to provide havens for German Jews in thinly populated areas in Africa, North America, and South America. He hoped to defray the enormous costs, including ships and temporary camps, through financing by governments and Jewish organizations.

Publicity about the Kennedy Plan included a sympathetic front-page story in the New York Times and an article in Life which declared that if "his plan for settling the German Jews, already known as the ‘Kennedy Plan’, succeeds, it will add new luster to a reputation that may well carry Joseph Patrick Kennedy into the White House." Roosevelt quickly threw cold water on his enthusiasm by denying any knowledge of the plan. In private, he vented at Kennedy’s "grandstanding," and rebuked him by announcing that henceforth Myron Taylor was to be the official spokesman on refugee issues. There is no indication that the president considered the plan on its merits.

==== Resignation ====
From late 1939 onwards, Kennedy began to suspect that Roosevelt and the State Department were excluding him from decision-making and communiqués pertinent to his ambassadorial duties. Roosevelt had started to communicate in secret with Winston Churchill (at this time First Lord of the Admiralty, later Prime Minister). In early 1940, Roosevelt also sent personal representatives (under Secretary of State Sumner Welles, and General William Donovan) on fact-finding missions to London and other European capitals, without advising Kennedy beforehand, thereby causing the ambassador great embarrassment and annoyance. As a result, Kennedy was, for much of 1940, determined to resign his post, although Roosevelt insisted he remain in London. In late October 1940, Roosevelt invited Kennedy to return to Washington for a pre-election consultation, Kennedy used this visit to announce his resignation. Kennedy agreed to make a nationwide radio speech to advocate Roosevelt's reelection. Roosevelt was pleased with the speech because, Nasaw says, it "rallied reluctant Irish Catholic voters to his side, buttressed his claims that he was not going to take the nation into war, and emphasized that he alone had the experience to lead the nation in these difficult times." Kennedy finally submitted his resignation at the White House on December 1, 1940, but agreed to remain Ambassador until a successor was chosen in early 1941.

For the rest of the war, relations between Kennedy and the Roosevelt administration remained tense, especially when Joe Jr., a Massachusetts delegate at the 1940 Democratic National Convention, vocally opposed Roosevelt's unprecedented nomination for a third term, which began in 1941. Kennedy may have wanted to run for president himself in 1940 or later. Having effectively removed himself from the national stage, Joe Sr. spent World War II on the sidelines. Kennedy stayed active in the smaller venues of rallying Irish-American and Roman Catholic Democrats to vote for Roosevelt's re-election for a fourth term in 1944. Kennedy claimed to be eager to help the war effort, but as a result of his previous gaffes, he was neither trusted nor invited to do so.

=== Alliances ===
Kennedy used his wealth and connections to build a national network of supporters that became the base for his sons' political careers. He especially concentrated on Irish-American communities in large cities, particularly Boston, New York, Chicago, Pittsburgh and several New Jersey cities. Kennedy also used Arthur Krock of The New York Times, America's most influential political columnist, for decades as a paid speechwriter and political advisor.

A political conservative (John F. Kennedy once described his father as being to "the right of Herbert Hoover"), Kennedy supported Richard Nixon, who had entered Congress with John in 1947. In 1960, Joe Kennedy approached Nixon, praised his anti-Communism, and said "Dick, if my boy can't make it, I'm for you" for the presidential election that year.

==== Alliance with Senator Joseph McCarthy ====
Kennedy's close ties with Republican Senator Joseph McCarthy of Wisconsin strengthened his family's position among Irish Catholics, but weakened it among liberals who strongly opposed McCarthy. Even before McCarthy became famous in 1950, Kennedy had forged close ties with the Republican Senator. Kennedy often brought him to his home in Hyannis Port, Massachusetts, as a weekend house guest in the late 1940s. McCarthy at one point dated his daughter Patricia.

When McCarthy became a dominant voice of anti-Communism starting in 1950, Kennedy contributed thousands of dollars to McCarthy, and became one of his major supporters. In the 1952 U.S. Senate race in Massachusetts, Kennedy apparently worked a deal so that McCarthy, a Republican, would not make campaign speeches for the Republican ticket in Massachusetts. In return, Congressman John F. Kennedy, running for the Senate seat, would not give any anti-McCarthy speeches that his liberal supporters wanted to hear.

At Kennedy's urging in 1953, McCarthy hired his 27-year-old son, Robert F. Kennedy, as a senior staff member of the Senate's investigations subcommittee, which McCarthy chaired. In 1954, when the Senate was threatening to condemn McCarthy, Senator John Kennedy faced a dilemma. "How could I demand that Joe McCarthy be censured for things he did when my own brother was on his staff?" asked John.

By 1954, Robert and McCarthy's chief aide Roy Cohn had fallen out with each other, and Robert no longer worked for McCarthy. John had a speech drafted calling for the censure of McCarthy, but never delivered it. When the Senate voted to censure McCarthy on December 2, 1954, Senator Kennedy was in a hospital and never indicated how he would cast his vote. Joe Kennedy strongly supported McCarthy to the end.

=== Involvement in sons' political careers ===
Kennedy's connections and influence were turned into political capital for the political campaigns of his sons: John, Robert, and Ted. Kennedy was influential in creating John's cabinet, which included Robert as U.S. attorney general, although he had never argued or tried a case. He was one of four fathers (the other three being George Tryon Harding, Nathaniel Fillmore, and George H. W. Bush) to live through the entire presidency of a son.

Kennedy had been consigned to the political shadows after his remarks during World War II ("Democracy is finished"), and he remained an intensely controversial figure among U.S. citizens because of his suspect business credentials, his Roman Catholicism, his opposition to Roosevelt's foreign policy, and his support for Joseph McCarthy. Although his own ambitions to achieve the U.S. presidency were thwarted, Kennedy held out great hope for his eldest son, Joe Jr., to seek the presidency. However, Joe Jr., who had become a U.S. Navy bomber pilot, was killed over the English Channel in August 1944 while undertaking Operation Anvil. After grieving over his dead son, Joe Sr. turned his attention to his second son, John, for a run for political office.

== Personal life ==
=== Marriage and children ===
On October 7, 1914, Kennedy married Rose Fitzgerald, the eldest daughter of Boston Mayor John F. Fitzgerald, in the private chapel of Archbishop William Henry O'Connell in Boston. After a two-week honeymoon, the couple settled at 83 Beals Street in the Boston suburb of Brookline, Massachusetts.

Joseph and Rose Kennedy had nine children: Joseph Jr. (1915–1944), John (1917–1963), Rose Marie "Rosemary" (1918–2005), Kathleen (1920–1948), Eunice (1921–2009), Patricia (1924–2006), Robert (1925–1968), Jean (1928–2020), and Edward (1932–2009). Three of the Kennedys' sons attained distinguished political positions: John F. Kennedy served as a U.S. representative from Massachusetts (1947–1953), a U.S. senator from Massachusetts (1953–1960), and as 35th president of the United States (1961–1963); Robert F. Kennedy served as U.S. attorney general (1961–1964) and as a U.S. senator from New York (1965–1968); and Edward M. Kennedy served as a U.S. senator from Massachusetts (1962–2009). One of the Kennedys' daughters, Eunice Kennedy Shriver, founded the Special Olympics for disabled people, while another, Jean Kennedy Smith, served as U.S. ambassador to Ireland.

As Kennedy's business success expanded, he and his family lived in increasing prosperity in Massachusetts, New York, around Washington, D.C., London, as well as the French Riviera. Their two permanent homes were located in Hyannis Port, Massachusetts, and Palm Beach, Florida.

Kennedy engaged in numerous extramarital relationships, including relationships with actresses Gloria Swanson and Marlene Dietrich and with his secretary, Janet DesRosiers Fontaine. He also managed Swanson's personal and business affairs.

=== Lobotomy of Rosemary Kennedy ===
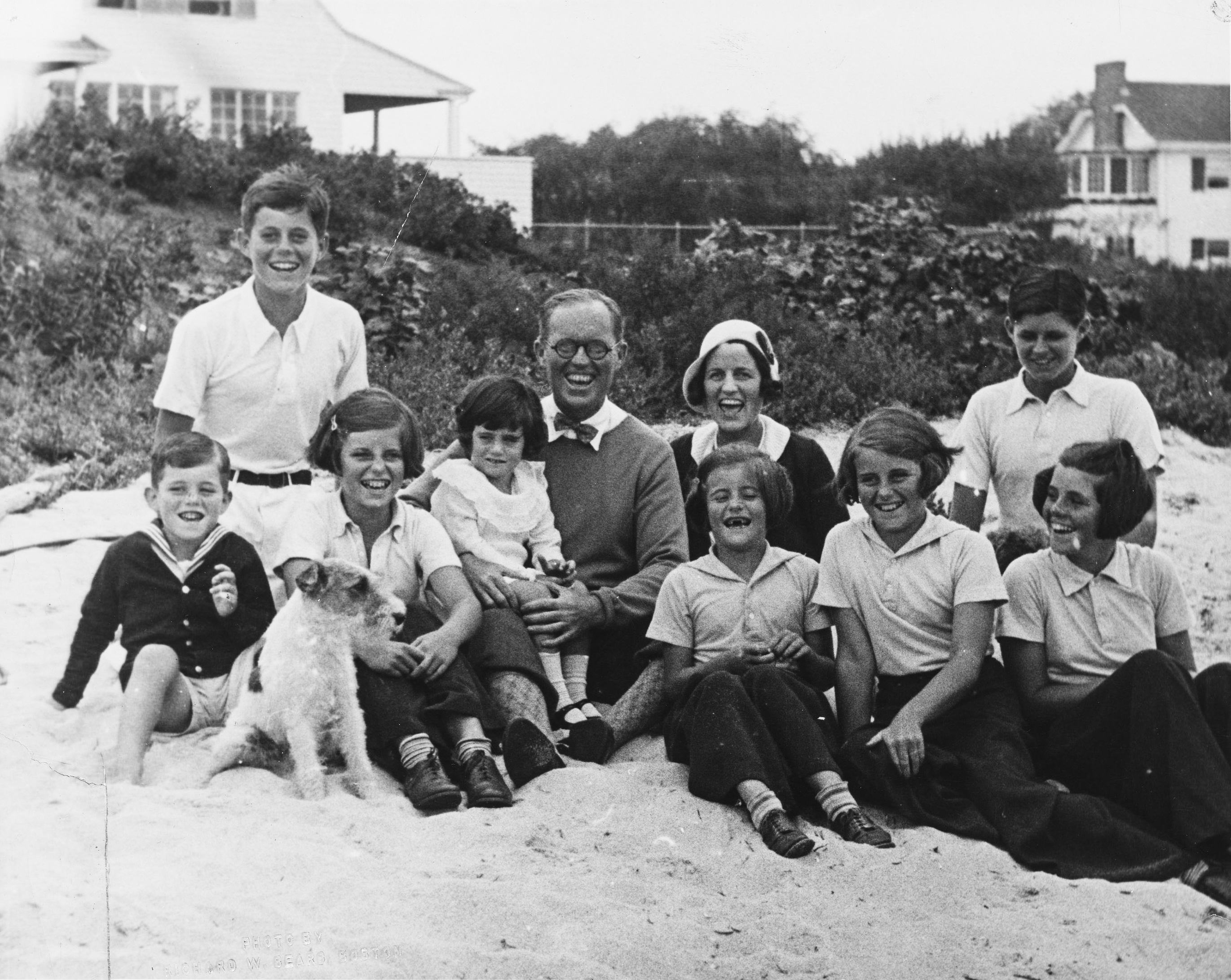
The Kennedy family at their home in Hyannis Port, Massachusetts, 1931. Rosemary Kennedy is seated on the far right.

When Rosemary Kennedy was 23 years old, doctors told Joseph Kennedy Sr. that a form of psychosurgery known as a lobotomy would help calm her mood swings and stop her occasional violent outbursts. (Accounts of Rosemary's life indicated that she was intellectually disabled, although some have raised questions about the Kennedys' accounts of the nature and scope of her disability.) Rosemary's erratic behavior frustrated her parents; her father was especially worried that she would shame and embarrass the family and damage his political career and that of his other children. Kennedy requested that surgeons perform a lobotomy on Rosemary. The lobotomy took place in November 1941. Kennedy did not inform his wife about the procedure until after it was completed. James W. Watts and Walter Freeman (both of George Washington University School of Medicine) performed the surgery.

The lobotomy was a disaster, leaving Rosemary Kennedy permanently incapacitated. Her mental capacity diminished to that of a two-year-old child; she could not walk or speak intelligibly and was incontinent. Following the lobotomy, Rosemary was immediately institutionalized. In 1949, she was relocated to Jefferson, Wisconsin, where she lived for the rest of her life on the grounds of the St. Coletta School for Exceptional Children (formerly known as "St. Coletta Institute for Backward Youth"). Kennedy did not visit his daughter at the institution. In Rosemary: The Hidden Kennedy Daughter, author Kate Clifford Larson stated that Rosemary's lobotomy was hidden from the family for twenty years. In 1961, after Kennedy suffered a stroke that left him unable to speak, his children were made aware of Rosemary's location. The lobotomy did not become public knowledge until 1987. Rosemary Kennedy died from natural causes on January 7, 2005, at the age of 86.

Dr. Bertram S. Brown, director of the National Institute of Mental Health who was previously an aide to President Kennedy, told a Kennedy biographer that Joseph Kennedy referred to Rosemary as mentally retarded rather than mentally ill in order to protect his son John's reputation for a presidential run. Brown added that the family's "lack of support for mental illness" was "part of a lifelong family denial of what was really so".

=== Illness and death ===
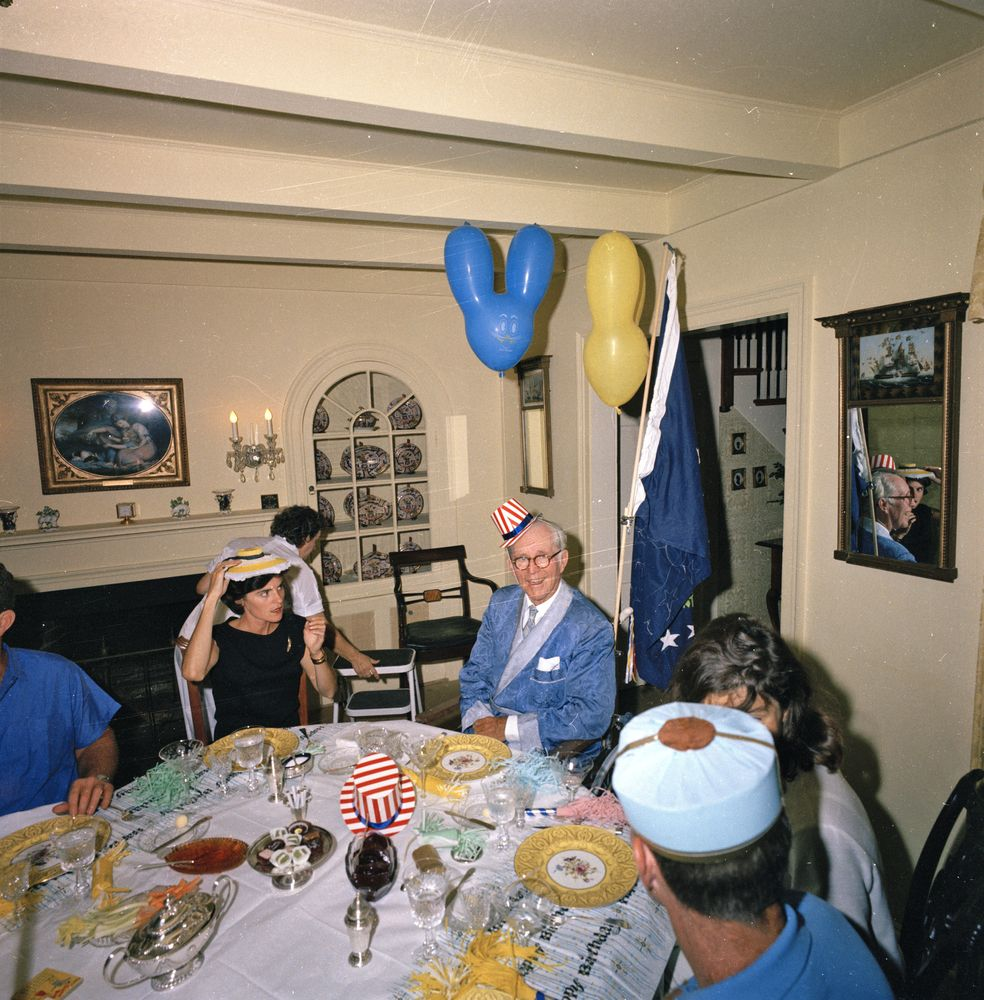
Kennedy (center) and family members sit at a table during his 75th birthday celebration in his home in Hyannis Port in 1963.

On December 19, 1961, at the age of 73, Kennedy suffered a stroke. He survived, but was left paralyzed on his right side. Thereafter, Kennedy suffered from aphasia, which severely affected his ability to speak. He remained mentally alert, regained certain functions with therapy, and began walking with a cane. Kennedy's speech also showed some improvement. He began to experience excessive muscular weakness, which eventually required him to use a wheelchair. In 1964, Kennedy was taken to The Institutes for the Achievement of Human Potential in Philadelphia, a medical and rehabilitative center for those who have experienced brain injury.

Kennedy's son Robert was shot on June 5, 1968, while running for president. He died the following morning at age 42. In the aftermath of Robert's death, Kennedy made his last public appearance when he, his wife, and son Ted made a filmed message to the country. Kennedy died at the Kennedy Compound in Hyannis Port the following year on November 18, 1969, two days before what would have been Robert's 44th birthday; he was 81 years old. Kennedy had outlived four of his children. He is buried at Holyhood Cemetery in Brookline, Massachusetts. Kennedy's widow, Rose, was buried next to him following her death in 1995 at age 104, as was his daughter Rosemary after her death in 2005.

== See also ==
- Kennedy curse
- Kennedy family

Government offices
New office	Chair of the United States Securities and Exchange Commission; 1934–1935	Succeeded by James M. Landis
Diplomatic posts
Preceded by Robert Worth Bingham	United States Ambassador to the United Kingdom; 1938–1940	Succeeded by John G. Winant
