= P. J. Kennedy =

American businessman and politician (1858–1929)

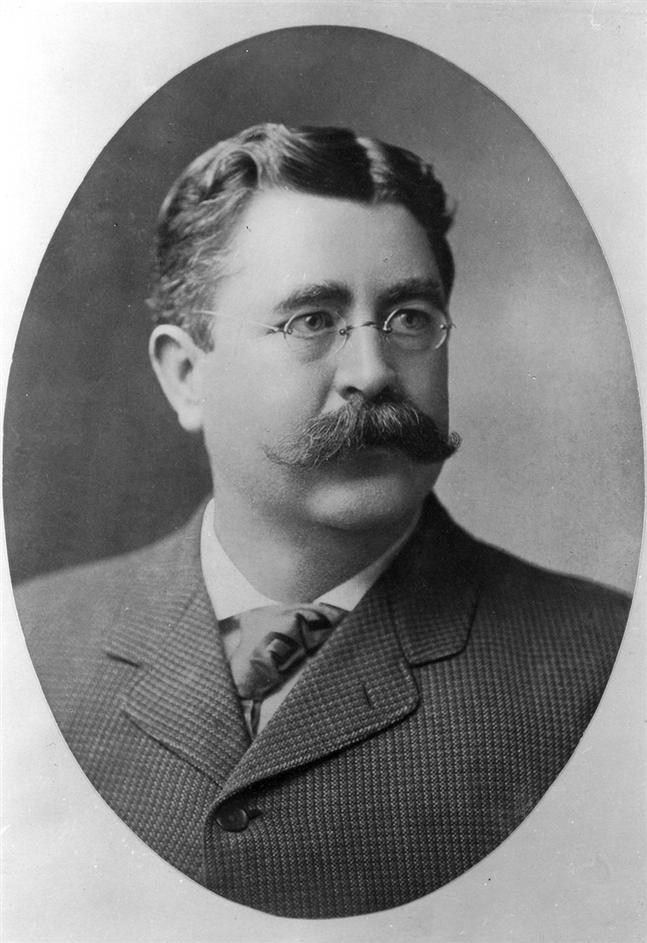

Member of the Massachusetts Senate from the 4th Suffolk district
- In office January 3, 1889 – January 3, 1895

Member of the Massachusetts House of Representatives from the 2nd Suffolk district
- In office January 3, 1884 – January 3, 1889

Personal details
- Born: Patrick Joseph Kennedy; January 14, 1858 Boston, Massachusetts, U.S.
- Died: May 18, 1929 (aged 71) Boston, Massachusetts, U.S.
- Party: Democratic
- Spouse: Mary Augusta Hickey (m. 1887; died 1923)
- Relations: Kennedy family
- Children: 4, including Joseph Sr.
- Parents: Patrick Kennedy; Bridget Murphy
- Occupation: Businessman; politician

Patrick Joseph Kennedy (January 14, 1858 – May 18, 1929) was an American businessman and Democratic Party politician from Boston. He was the earliest member of the Kennedy family to take an active involvement in politics and became a major figure in local and state politics. Through his son Joseph P. Kennedy Sr.'s marriage to Rose Fitzgerald, a daughter of his political contemporary John F. Fitzgerald, he was the paternal grandfather of John F. Kennedy, Robert F. Kennedy, and Ted Kennedy.

Kennedy was born in Boston in 1858. After cholera killed his father and brother, he was the only surviving male in his family. He started work at age fourteen and became a successful saloon proprietor and whiskey importer. Eventually, he had major interests in coal and banking as well.

Kennedy was a major figure in the Democratic Party in Boston. Though he served in both the Massachusetts House of Representatives and the state Senate, he preferred to play a behind-the-scenes role as a party boss.

== Early life ==
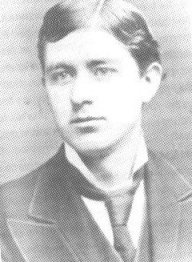
Young Kennedy around the mid-to-late 1870s

Patrick Joseph Kennedy was born on January 14, 1858, in Boston, Massachusetts. He was the youngest of five children born to Patrick Kennedy and Bridget Murphy. His parents were Irish Catholic immigrants who were both from New Ross, County Wexford, and emigrated to America together to flee the Great Famine in Ireland. The couple's elder son John had died of cholera in infancy two years before Kennedy was born. Ten months after P. J. Kennedy's birth, his father Patrick also succumbed to the infectious epidemic that infested the family's East Boston neighborhood. As the only surviving male, Kennedy was the first family member to receive a formal education, attending Sacred Heart, a private Catholic school in Boston. His mother Bridget had purchased an East Boston stationery and notions store where she had worked. The business took off and expanded into a grocery and liquor store.

At the age of fourteen, young Kennedy left school to help support his mother and three older sisters, Mary, Joanna, and Margaret, as a stevedore on the Boston docks. In the 1880s, with money he had saved from his modest earnings and help from his mother Bridget, he launched a business career by buying a saloon in the Haymarket Square neighborhood near downtown Boston. In time, he bought a second establishment by the East Boston docks. Next, to capitalize on the social drinking of upper-class Bostonians, Kennedy purchased a third bar in an upscale East Boston hotel, the Maverick House. Before he was 30, his growing prosperity allowed him to buy a whiskey-importing business, P. J. Kennedy and Company.

== Marriage and children ==
On November 23, 1887, Kennedy married Mary Augusta Hickey. The couple had four children and remained married until Hickey's death on May 20, 1923. His wealth afforded them a home on Jeffries Point in East Boston.

Name	Birth	Death	Age	Notes
Joseph Patrick Kennedy Sr.	September 6, 1888	November 18, 1969	81 years, 2 months	Married on October 7, 1914, to Rose Elizabeth Fitzgerald (July 22, 1890 – January 22, 1995); 9 children
Francis Benedict Kennedy	March 11, 1891	June 14, 1892	1 year, 3 months	Died of Diphtheria
Mary Loretta Kennedy	August 6, 1892	November 18, 1972	80 years, 3 months	Married on October 12, 1927, to George William Connelly (June 10, 1898 – August 29, 1971); one daughter
Margaret Louise Kennedy	October 22, 1898	November 14, 1974	76 years, 23 days	Married on June 14, 1924, to Charles Joseph Burke (August 23, 1899 – April 5, 1967); three children

== Associates and political career ==
Kennedy was, as Robert Dallek describes, "always ready to help less fortunate fellow Irishmen with a little cash and some sensible advice." He was a sociable man who mixed comfortably with both Roman Catholic and Protestant elites. In February 1885, Kennedy was among the chief mourners at the funeral of Irish-American land developer Michael Doheny Jr. alongside the U.S. Congressman, John G. Carlisle; Canadian Senator, John Costigan; and Canadian Member of Parliament, J.J. Curran and the Governor General of Canada, Henry Petty-Fitzmaurice, 5th Marquess of Lansdowne.

Kennedy moved successfully into politics in 1884, when the Democrats were a minority in the Republican-dominated Massachusetts General Court. Kennedy served five single-year terms in the Massachusetts House of Representatives, and then three two-year terms in the Massachusetts Senate. He became one of Boston's leading Democrats, giving a seconding speech for Grover Cleveland at the 1888 Democratic National Convention in St. Louis. More drawn to behind-the-scenes political work, Kennedy left the Massachusetts Senate in 1895 and focused his energies on his role as boss in Boston's Ward Two, serving on the Democratic party's unofficial Board of Strategy and on the local elections and fire commissions.

== Death and funeral ==
By the time of his death in 1929, Kennedy held an interest in a coal company and a substantial amount of stock in a bank, the Columbia Trust Company.

In his later years, Kennedy developed degenerative liver disease. In April 1929, he was admitted to Deaconess Hospital to receive treatment. He died there on May 18 at the age of 71. His funeral was held at St. John the Evangelist Church in Winthrop, Massachusetts, on May 21. The Boston Globe reported that hundreds of mourners lined the streets to watch Kennedy's funeral procession and businesses in East Boston closed to honor him. Kennedy is buried in Holy Cross Cemetery in Malden, Massachusetts.

== Legacy ==
In 1914, P. J. Kennedy's son Joseph married Rose Fitzgerald (July 22, 1890 – January 22, 1995), the eldest daughter of Boston Mayor John F. Fitzgerald (1863–1950). Joseph P. Kennedy Sr. went on to become a U.S. Securities and Exchange Commission Chair and a U.S. Ambassador to the United Kingdom.

Joseph and Rose Kennedy had nine children, including World War II casualty Joseph P. Kennedy Jr., U.S. President John F. Kennedy, U.S. Attorney General and U.S. Senator Robert F. Kennedy, and U.S. Senator Ted Kennedy.
