= Patrick Kennedy (farmer) =

Irish farmer and cooper (1823–1858)

- Kennedy circa 1850
- Born: 1823; Dunganstown, County Wexford, Ireland
- Died: November 22, 1858 (aged 35); Boston, Massachusetts
- Spouse: Bridget Murphy (m. 1849)
- Children: 5, including P. J.
- Relatives: Kennedy family

Patrick Kennedy (1823 – November 22, 1858) was an Irish-American farmer and cooper. He was the father of Patrick Joseph Kennedy and a direct ancestor of the Kennedy political dynasty.

Patrick Kennedy represents one of the family's links to their Irish heritage, having emigrated to the United States due to the Great Famine in Ireland.

== Early life ==
Kennedy was born in 1823 in Dunganstown, although no records exist of his birth. Kennedy was the third son in his family, where his father was a farmer. Penal laws forced priests to perform sacraments in secrecy, and keeping documents risked the lives of clergymen and parishioners' lives. The Catholic Emancipation had little effect on Kennedy's life; his family had been oppressed for 6 generations. Kennedy's father's wife died on February 16, 1835.

Both of Kennedy's parents were dead by the time he became an adult. Kennedy's family's property was controlled by Patrick Kennedy's older brother, John Kennedy. Kennedy became a farmer in Dunganstown. Kennedy hauled his family's barley to a brewery in New Ross 2-3 times a week. Kennedy also worked as a barrel maker in a cooperage near the brewery. Due to Irish rebellion, Irish tenant farmers, including those of the Kennedy family, had to pay increased rents on Gale Day. Kennedy was upset about what the British landlords were doing to his family. Kennedy paid his rent in barley and malt.

Famine in Ireland forced Kennedy to move to the United States. Kennedy followed his friend, Patrick Barron, who realized that he needed to leave before Kennedy. Kennedy left in October 1848. It is suspected that Kennedy's family held an American wake—an event for the family who would stay to say goodbye to an emigrant.

== Emigration ==
The exact route Kennedy took is unknown. Some, including the White House press corps in 1963, suspect Kennedy left New Ross and went directly to Boston. The manifest of the ship Kennedy took to Boston shows that the ship left from Liverpool. Interviews with members of the Kennedy family and modern accounts by Irish historians claim he took a complicated route to the United States, which was common with poor tenant farmers emigrating to the United States. Kennedy lived in Liverpool until he could get a ship to go to the United States. Kennedy left Liverpool on the Washington Irving. It took Kennedy 6 months to arrive in Boston.

Irish emigrants, like Kennedy, were kept in the bottom of the boat. The Irish emigrants were fed foods like salt herrings or a moldy piece of cheese and a stale biscuit. Vere Foster later made a petition to complain about the conditions on the Washington Irving. Ships like the Washington Irving were known as coffin ships, as dead bodies were thrown into the sea.

== Life in the United States ==
Kennedy arrived in Boston in November 1848. After the cabin-class passengers left the ship, Kennedy was allowed to leave. Inspectors were stationed to stop sick passengers, but Kennedy was found healthy enough to enter. Kennedy stated, when asked by the inspectors, that his occupation was laborer.

Loretta Connelly, a Kennedy family historian and Kennedy's granddaughter, has claimed that Kennedy and Bridget Murphy met on the Washington Irving, but her name wasn't on the ship's manifest. The ship had two female passengers listed under the name "Barron"—neither was the same age of Murphy. Kennedy relatives in Ireland and Irish historians claim that Kennedy and Murphy met in Wexford, intending to marry in Boston. Kennedy and Murphy agreed to get married after Kennedy saved up enough money.

Kennedy initially lived in a boarding house on Border Street. Kennedy paid $1 a week in advance for a room shared with several other men. Kennedy then got a job as a barrel maker at Daniel Francis's cooperage and brass foundry in Noddle's Island. Kennedy managed to make enough money as a cooper to follow through with marrying Murphy. On September 26, 1849, Kennedy was married to Murphy in the Cathedral of the Holy Cross.

Patrick and Bridget Kennedy had their first daughter, Mary, in 1851, their second, Johanna, in 1852, their first son, John, in 1854, and their third daughter, Margaret, in July 1855. Their son, John Kennedy, died of cholera in the summer of 1855. Patrick and Bridget Kennedy had Patrick Joseph Kennedy on January 14, 1858. Kennedy wrote to his family to inform them of the good news.

Kennedy became ill in 1858. The shrinking economy of Boston likely led to Kennedy losing his job. An assessor's report for the second ward of Boston showed that the Kennedy family's income shrank from $300 in 1852 to $100 in 1856. Kennedy then caught cholera and died on November 22, 1858.
