= Wolf Point East Tower =

Skyscraper in Chicago, Illinois

Coordinates: 41°53′16.1″N 87°38′12.4″W

Wolf Point East Tower is the second tallest of three buildings being developed in the Near North Side community area on the Wolf Point property at a fork in the Chicago River in downtown Chicago. The building is planned to be approximately 60 stories and 660 feet (201.2 m) tall. It will have 698 units. Although originally intended to be a mixed use building when planned in 2012 and approved in 2013, the building was reenvisioned as an apartment building in 2016. Construction began in 2017 and is currently finished.

== Background ==
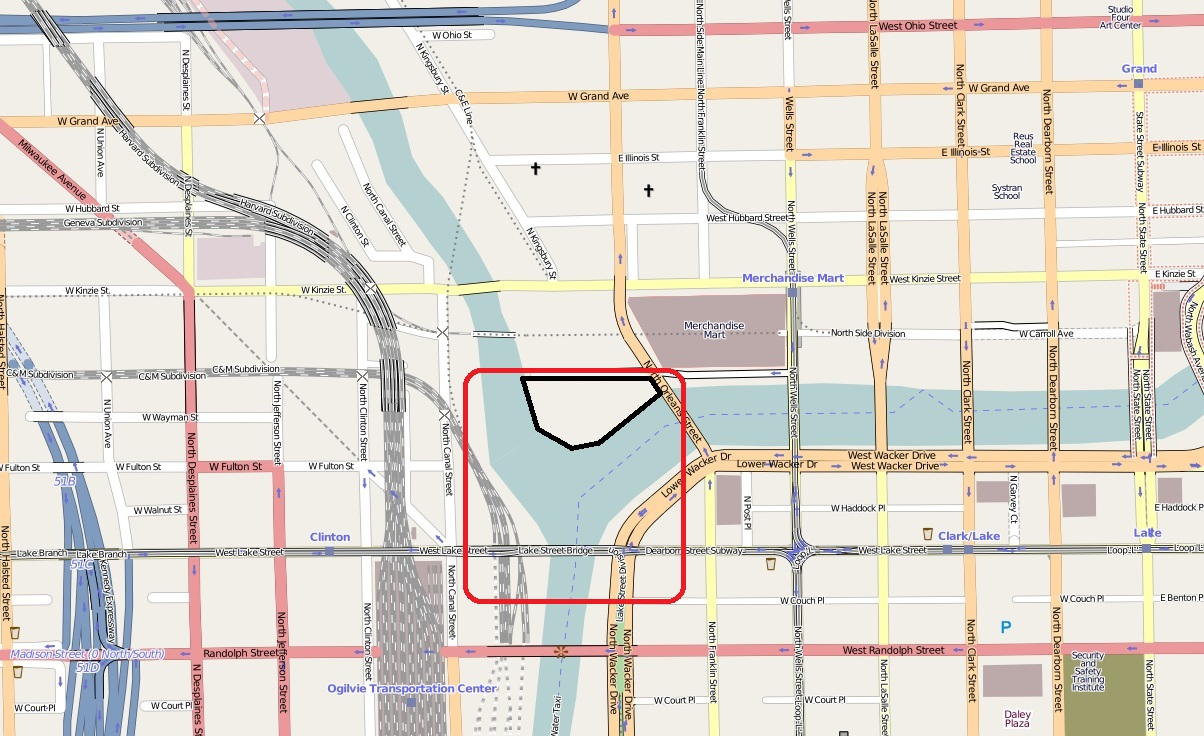
Map depicting Wolf Point (area owned by the Kennedy family in black, with approximate area of the historical Wolf Point settlement in red)

On January 26, 2012, the Chicago Sun-Times broke the story that the Kennedy family was planning a three-tower development at Wolf Point. On May 8, 2012, Chicago Alderman Brendan Reilly announced that a three-tower proposal for Wolf Point had been made including buildings of approximately 900 feet (274.32 m), 750 feet (228.60 m) and 525 feet (160.02 m) and that plans would be made public on May 29. In a formalization of the proposal later that year the East Tower continued to be planned at 750 feet (228.60 m). By October 2016 the height of the east tower had been revised down to 675 feet (205.74 m), and the south tower revised to 950 feet (289.56 m). The October 2016 revision was estimated to have 62 stories by on source and 66 by another. As of March 2017, some sources still felt the building might be 66 stories and encompass 707 apartment units, but when the building permit for construction was issued on June 22, 2017, it seemed that the plans were for a 60-story, 698-unit, 660-foot (201.17 m) building. By June 28, the $380 million construction project was backed by a $200 million loan led by Bank of America and construction had begun. Occupancy was expected in 2019.

== Location ==
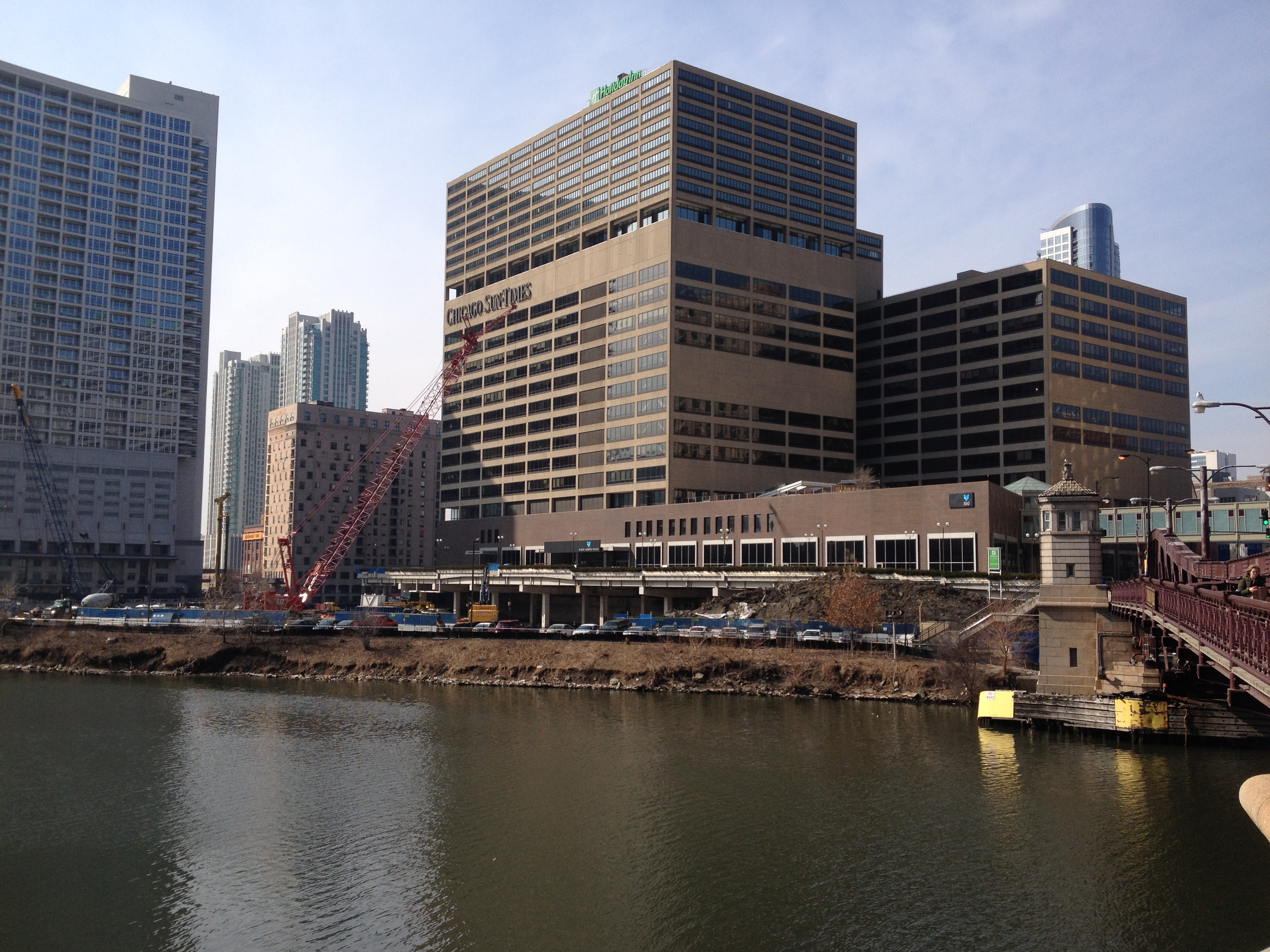
The site of Wolf Point South Tower in March 2014

The property upon which the development was planned is historic and drew scrutiny by critics. Plans for the tower development were presented as scheduled by the Kennedy family on land that they own in the River North neighborhood at the confluence of South, North, and Main Branches of the Chicago River southwest of the Merchandise Mart complex. As plans for the Kennedy proposal were developing on the north bank of Wolf Point, a plan for a 45- to 50-story office building on the west bank called River Point were progressing according to Robert Sharoff of The New York Times. Chicago Tribune Pulitzer Prize-winning architecture critic Blair Kamin felt that the initial plans presented by Christopher G. Kennedy needed some work.

== History ==
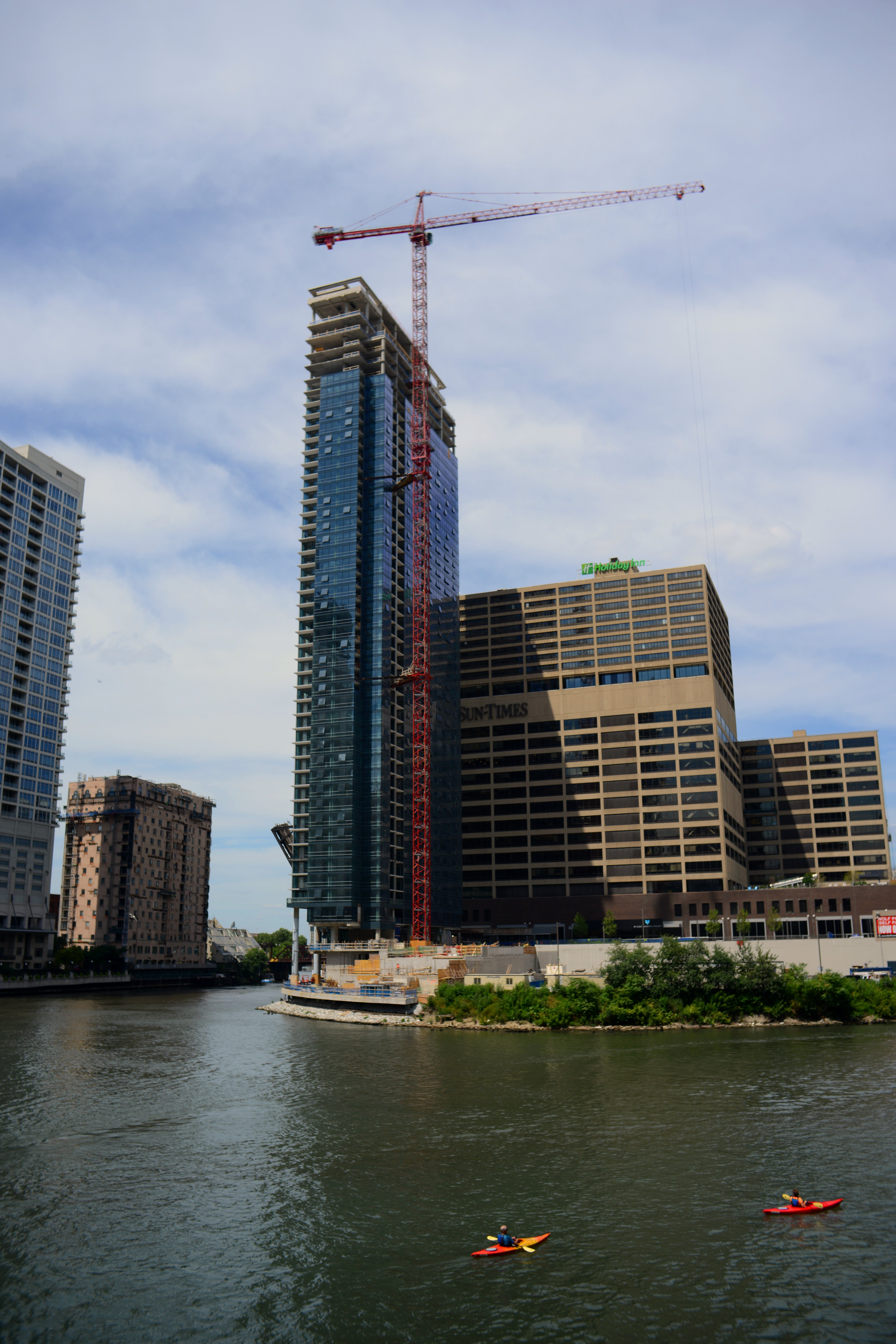
West Tower under construction

On October 30, 2012, a revised plan was presented that included more open space. In November the responses to the revisions were negative, and Reilly withdrew the proposal on November 27. The Chicago Plan Commission approved the plans for the entire three-tower development that included 1,410 residential units, 450 hotel rooms and 1,285 parking stalls on January 24, 2013.

In May 2013, opponents of the planned development filed suit in United States Federal Court. On November 19, 2013, U.S. District Judge Amy J. St. Eve ruled that the valuable and iconic views of downtown are not something that can be constitutionally protected saying "Illinois courts do not recognize property values, air, or light as constitutionally protected property interests." The Wolf Point Towers broke ground in March 2014. Neighboring Wolf Point West Tower had its groundbreaking ceremony on July 18, 2014. The building opened for residence on January 13, 2016.

After the 48-story, 485-foot (147.8 m) Wolf Point West Tower was successfully marketed as an apartment building, the East Tower was revamped as an apartment building in 2016. 2016 design changes resulted in a greatly reduced footprint and use of only 660 feet (201.2 m) of the 750-foot (228.6 m) entitlement.

The building was designed by Pelli Clarke Pelli & Pappageorge Haymes Partners, developed by Hines Interests and the Kennedy family with backing from the real estate investment arm of the AFL–CIO's pension.

== See also ==
- List of tallest buildings in Chicago
- List of tallest buildings in the United States
