= Kennedy family =

American political family

- United States political family
- Parent family: O'Kennedy
- Country: Dunganstown, New Ross, County Wexford, Ireland
- Current region: United States
- Titles: List: President of the United States; First Lady of the United States; United States Attorney General; United States Secretary of Health and Human Services; United States Ambassador (to Australia, Austria, France, Ireland, Japan, and the United Kingdom); United States Special Envoy for Northern Ireland; United States Senator (Massachusetts, New York); United States Congressman (Massachusetts, Rhode Island); Lieutenant Governor of Maryland; State senator (Connecticut, Massachusetts); State representative (Maryland, Massachusetts); Mayor (Santa Monica, California); Papal countess; Marchioness of Hartington
- Estates: List: 83 Beals Street (Brookline, Massachusetts); Kennedy Compound (Hyannis Port, Massachusetts); Hickory Hill (McLean, Virginia); La Querida (Palm Beach, Florida); Wexford (Marshall, Virginia)

The Kennedy family is an American political family that has long been prominent in American politics, public service, entertainment and business. In 1884, 35 years after the family's arrival from County Wexford, Ireland, Patrick Joseph "P. J." Kennedy became the first Kennedy elected to public office, serving in the Massachusetts state legislature until 1895. At least one Kennedy family member was serving in federal elective office in every year from 1947, when P. J. Kennedy's grandson John F. Kennedy became a member of Congress from Massachusetts, until 2011, when Patrick J. Kennedy II (John's nephew) retired as a member of the U.S. House of Representatives from Rhode Island.

P. J.'s son Joseph P. Kennedy Sr. and his wife, Rose Fitzgerald Kennedy, had nine children, including John F. Kennedy, who served in both houses of the United States Congress and as U.S. president; Robert F. Kennedy, who served as U.S. Attorney General and as a U.S. senator; Ted Kennedy, who served more than 46 years in the U.S. Senate; and Jean Kennedy Smith, who served as U.S. ambassador to Ireland.

Other Kennedy descendants include members of the U.S. House of Representatives, two U.S. ambassadors, one U.S. envoy, a lieutenant governor, three state legislators (one of whom also served in the U.S. House of Representatives), and one mayor. Joseph and Rose's daughter Eunice played a vital role in establishing the National Institute of Child Health and Human Development (part of the National Institutes of Health) and the Special Olympics. Robert F. Kennedy Jr. is the current United States secretary of health and human services. Other descendants of Joseph and Rose Kennedy have been lawyers, authors, and activists on behalf of those with physical and intellectual disabilities.

== History ==
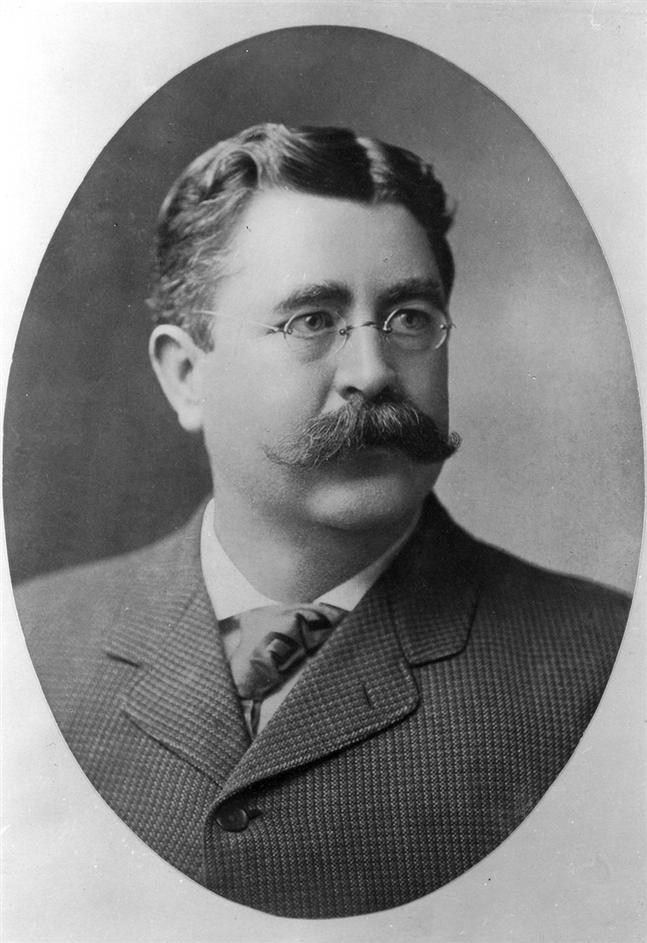
Patrick Joseph (P.J.) Kennedy, the founding patriarch of the Kennedy political family.

According to genealogist Brian Kennedy in his work JFK's Irish O'Kennedy Ancestors, the Kennedys who would go on to play a significant role in the United States of America originated from an Irish clan called Ó Cinnéide Fionn (the Grey Kennedys), which, along with the Ó Cinnéide Donn (Brown Kennedys) and Ó Cinnéide Ruadh (Red Kennedys), were the three Irish Gaelic O'Kennedy clans who ruled the Kingdom of Ormond. In 1546, their progenitor Diarmaid Ó Cinnéide Fionn became the owner of Knigh Castle, located close to what is today Puckane, County Tipperary. In 1740, having lost out to the new Anglo-Irish order in the Kingdom of Ireland, they moved to Dunganstown, New Ross, County Wexford. Patrick Kennedy was born there.

Patrick Kennedy (1823–1858) and Bridget Murphy (1824–1888) sailed from New Ross to Boston, Massachusetts, in 1849, fleeing the Great Famine. Patrick settled in East Boston and worked there as a barrel maker, or cooper, and had five children with Bridget. Their youngest, Patrick Joseph "P. J." Kennedy, went into business and served in the Massachusetts state legislature from 1884 to 1895.

P.J. and his wife, Mary Augusta Hickey, had four children. Their oldest was Joseph Patrick "Joe" Kennedy Sr., a businessman who amassed a private fortune in banking and securities trading, which he further expanded by investing in filmmaking and real estate. He also founded Somerset Importers and owned Chicago's Merchandise Mart.

In 1914, Joseph Sr. married Rose Elizabeth Fitzgerald, a daughter of P.J.'s political rival, John Francis "Honey Fitz" Fitzgerald. The couple had nine children: Joseph Patrick Jr. (called Joe Jr.) (1915–1944), John Fitzgerald (called Jack) (1917–1963), Rose Marie (called Rosemary) (1918–2005), Kathleen Agnes (called Kick) (1920–1948), Eunice Mary (1921–2009), Patricia Helen (1924–2006), Robert Francis (called Bobby) (1925–1968), Jean Ann (1928–2020) and Edward Moore (called Ted) (1932–2009).

Joseph Sr. was appointed by President Franklin D. Roosevelt as the first chairman of the Securities and Exchange Commission (SEC), chairman of the Maritime Commission, and U.S. ambassador to the United Kingdom from 1938 to 1940. He served from 1947 to 1949 on the Hoover Commission (the "Commission on Organization of the Executive Branch of the Government"), which was appointed by President Harry Truman to recommend administrative changes in the federal government. Rose Fitzgerald Kennedy was named countess by Pope Pius XII in 1951 in recognition of her "exemplary motherhood and many charitable works."

Selective Kennedy family tree

Joseph Patrick Kennedy Sr.	Rose Elizabeth Fitzgerald
Joseph Patrick Kennedy Jr.	John Fitzgerald Kennedy	Rose Marie Kennedy	Kathleen Agnes Kennedy	Eunice Mary Kennedy	Patricia Helen Kennedy	Robert Francis Kennedy	Jean Ann Kennedy	Edward Moore Kennedy
Caroline Bouvier Kennedy (b. 1957)	John Fitzgerald Kennedy Jr. (1960–1999)	Patrick Bouvier Kennedy (1963–1963)	Robert Sargent Shriver III (b. 1954)	Maria Owings Shriver (b. 1955)	Timothy Perry Shriver (b. 1959)	Mark Kennedy Shriver (b. 1964)	Anthony Paul Kennedy Shriver (b. 1965)	Christopher Kennedy Lawford (1955–2018)	Kathleen Hartington Kennedy (b. 1951)	Joseph Patrick Kennedy II (b. 1952)	Robert Francis Kennedy Jr. (b. 1954)	Mary Kerry Kennedy (b. 1959)	Christopher George Kennedy (b. 1963)	Matthew Maxwell Taylor Kennedy (b. 1965)	William Kennedy Smith (b. 1960)	Kara Anne Kennedy (1960–2011)	Edward Moore Kennedy Jr. (b. 1961)	Patrick Joseph Kennedy II (b. 1967)
Rose Kennedy Schlossberg (b. 1988)	Tatiana Celia Kennedy Schlossberg (1990–2025)	John Bouvier Kennedy Schlossberg (b. 1993)	Katherine Eunice Schwarzenegger (b. 1989)	Patrick Arnold Shriver Schwarzenegger (b. 1993)	Maeve Fahey Kennedy Townsend (1979–2020)	Joseph Patrick Kennedy III (b. 1980)	Robert F. Kennedy III (b. 1984)	Matthew Maxwell Taylor Kennedy Jr. (b. 1993)

== Public service ==
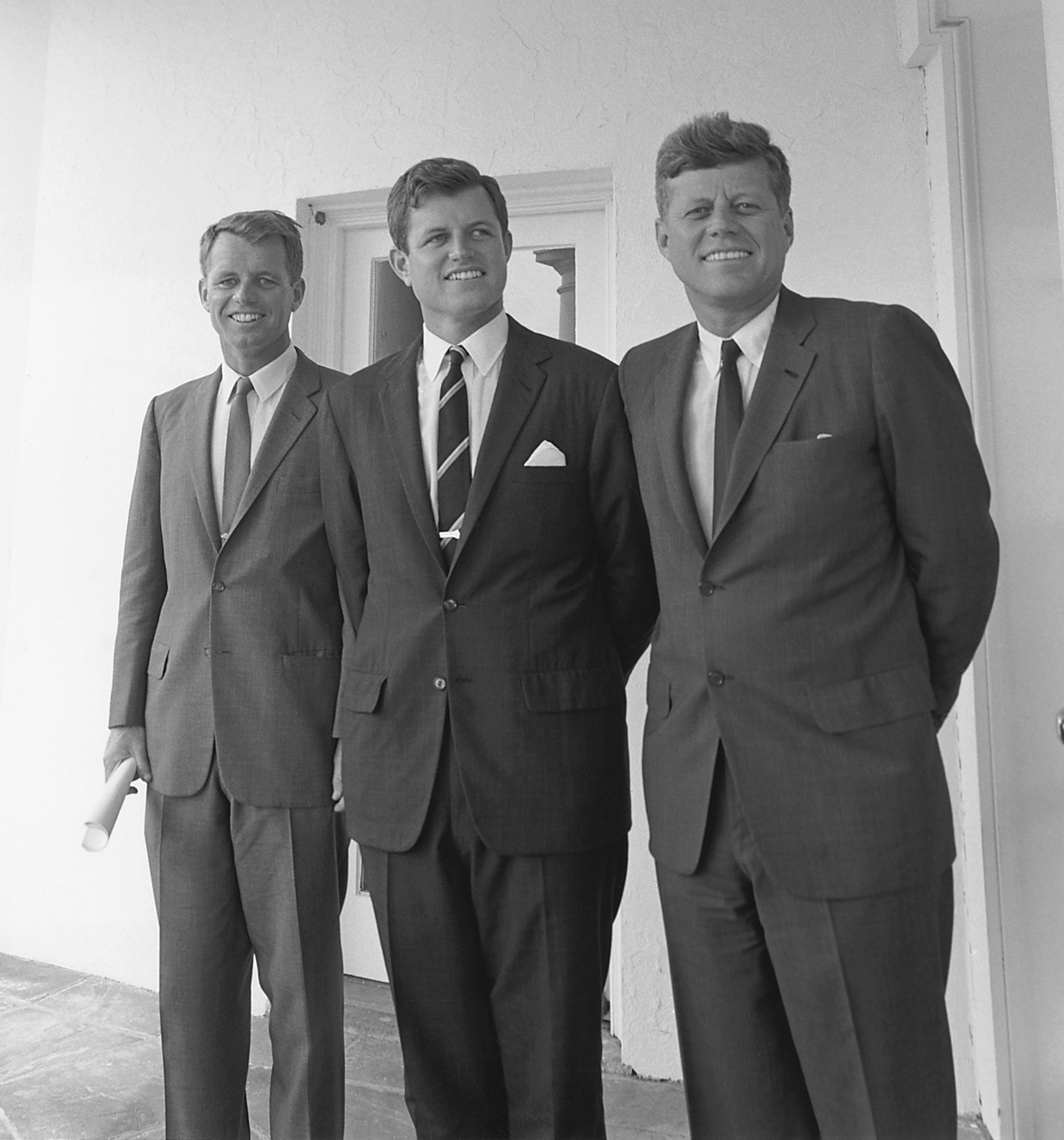
Brothers Robert F. Kennedy (left), Ted Kennedy (center) and John F. Kennedy (right) at the White House in 1963

Every Kennedy elected to public office has served as a Democrat, and other members of the family have worked for the party or held Cabinet posts in Democratic administrations. Robert F. Kennedy Jr. is an exception, having taken a cabinet post in a Republican administration (though he is registered as an independent). Many Kennedys have attended Harvard University, and the family has contributed greatly to the university's John F. Kennedy School of Government.

Joseph Sr. served as United States ambassador to the United Kingdom between 1938 and 1940. After he resigned due to his attitude towards Nazi Germany, he expected his eldest son, Joseph Jr., to go into politics and to ultimately be elected president. Joseph Jr. was elected as a Massachusetts delegate to the 1940 Democratic National Convention and enlisted in the U.S. Navy after the United States entered World War II. He was killed in 1944 when the bomber he was piloting exploded in flight near the coast of England. Joseph Sr.'s desire to see the family involved in politics and government then focused on John, who had considered a career as a journalist, having authored a book (Why England Slept) and done some reporting for Hearst Newspapers. After returning from Navy service, John served in the U.S. House of Representatives representing Massachusetts's 11th congressional district from 1947 to 1953, and then as U.S. senator from Massachusetts from 1953 to 1960. In the 1960 presidential election, John narrowly defeated Republican opponent Richard Nixon.

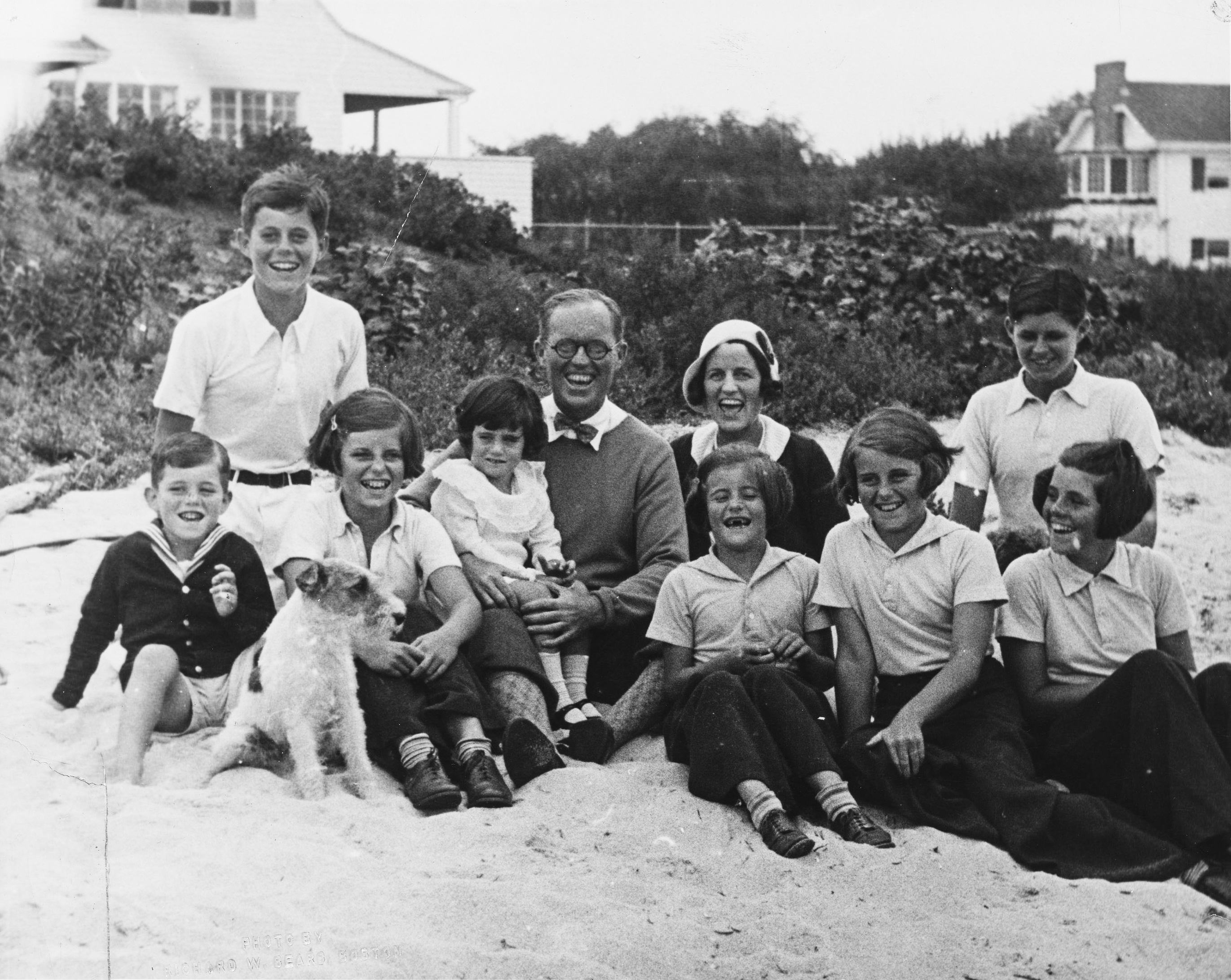
Joseph P. Kennedy Sr. and Rose Kennedy with their children at the Kennedy Compound in 1931

During John's administration, Robert served as attorney general, their brother-in-law Sargent Shriver served as director of the new Peace Corps, and Ted became the U.S. Senator from Massachusetts until his death in 2009. The Kennedy administration's accomplishments include the Alliance for Progress with Latin America, the establishment of the Peace Corps, a peaceful resolution to the Cuban Missile Crisis in October 1962, the Nuclear Test Ban Treaty of 1963, the Twenty-fourth Amendment to the United States Constitution ending the poll tax, the continuation of the Apollo spaceflight program with the goal of landing a man on the Moon, and the introduction of the Civil Rights Act of 1964 to Congress (signed into law by Kennedy's successor Lyndon B. Johnson). The family was the subject of intense media coverage during and after Kennedy's presidency.

Ted served in the Senate with his brother Robert (1965–1968), and was serving in the Senate when his nephew, Joseph P. II, and his son, Patrick J., served in the U.S. House of Representatives representing Massachusetts's 8th congressional district (1987–1999) and Rhode Island's 1st congressional district (1995–2011), respectively. In November 2012, Joseph P. Kennedy III, son of former U.S. representative Joseph P. Kennedy II and grandson of former senator Robert F. Kennedy, was elected to the U.S. House of Representatives from Massachusetts's 4th congressional district. In 2020, Joseph P. III lost the U.S. Senate primary election in Massachusetts to incumbent Ed Markey, the first Kennedy to ever lose an election in the state.

In the 2020s, three Kennedy family members served as U.S. ambassadors or envoys. Victoria Reggie Kennedy, second wife of Ted Kennedy, was named in 2021 by President Joe Biden as U.S. ambassador to Austria. Caroline Kennedy, daughter of President Kennedy, was named in 2022 by President Biden as U.S. ambassador to Australia; she previously served as U.S. ambassador to Japan under President Barack Obama. In the same year, Joseph P. Kennedy III was named by President Biden as U.S. special envoy to Northern Ireland.

Robert F. Kennedy Jr. ran for president in the 2024 United States presidential election, originally as a Democrat, but changing his affiliation to Independent in October 2023. Family members spoke out against him, mainly due to his anti-vaccine views, and instead endorsed President Joe Biden. In August 2024, two months before the election, Robert Jr. withdrew and endorsed Republican candidate Donald Trump, who won the election. Trump nominated him to be United States Secretary of Health and Human Services and he was confirmed by the U.S. Senate by a vote of 52–48. Jack Schlossberg, son of Caroline Kennedy, was a Democratic candidate in the 2026 election for New York's 12th congressional district.

== Businesses ==
The following is a list of businesses in which members of the Kennedy family have held a controlling or otherwise significant financial interest.

- Citizens Energy Corporation
- Columbia Trust Company
- FBO Pictures Corporation
- George (magazine)
- Hialeah Park Race Track
- Intercontinental Rubber Company
- Kennedy & Madonna LLP (law firm)
- Kenoil Corporation
- Marwood Group (healthcare-focused consulting firm)
- Merchandise Mart Properties, Inc.
- Mokeen Oil Company
- Old Colony Realty Associates
- RKO Pictures
- Somerset Imports
- Sumner Savings Bank
- Wolf Point East Tower
- Salesforce Tower Chicago

== Philanthropy and policy institutes ==
- Advocates for Opioid Recovery
- Best Buddies International
- Citizens Energy Corporation
- Eunice Kennedy Shriver National Center for Community of Caring
- Eunice Kennedy Shriver National Institute of Child Health & Human Development
- Global Recovery Initiative
- John F. Kennedy Library Foundation
- Joseph P. Kennedy Jr. Foundation
- Robert F. Kennedy Center For Justice & Human Rights
- Smart Approaches to Marijuana
- Special Olympics
- Stop Handgun Violence
- Top Box Foods
- VSA (Kennedy Center)
- White House Historical Association
- Waterkeeper Alliance

== Government offices held ==
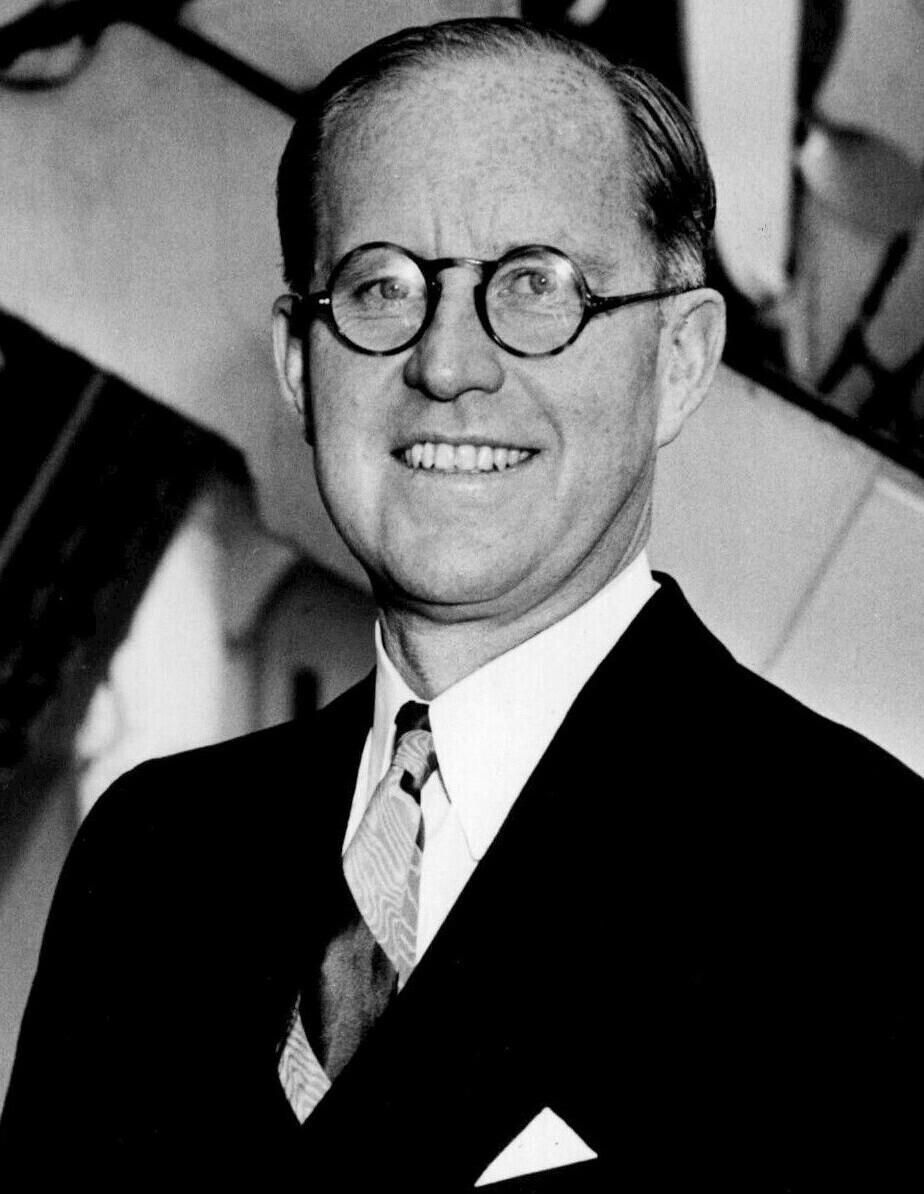
Joseph P. Kennedy, Sr.

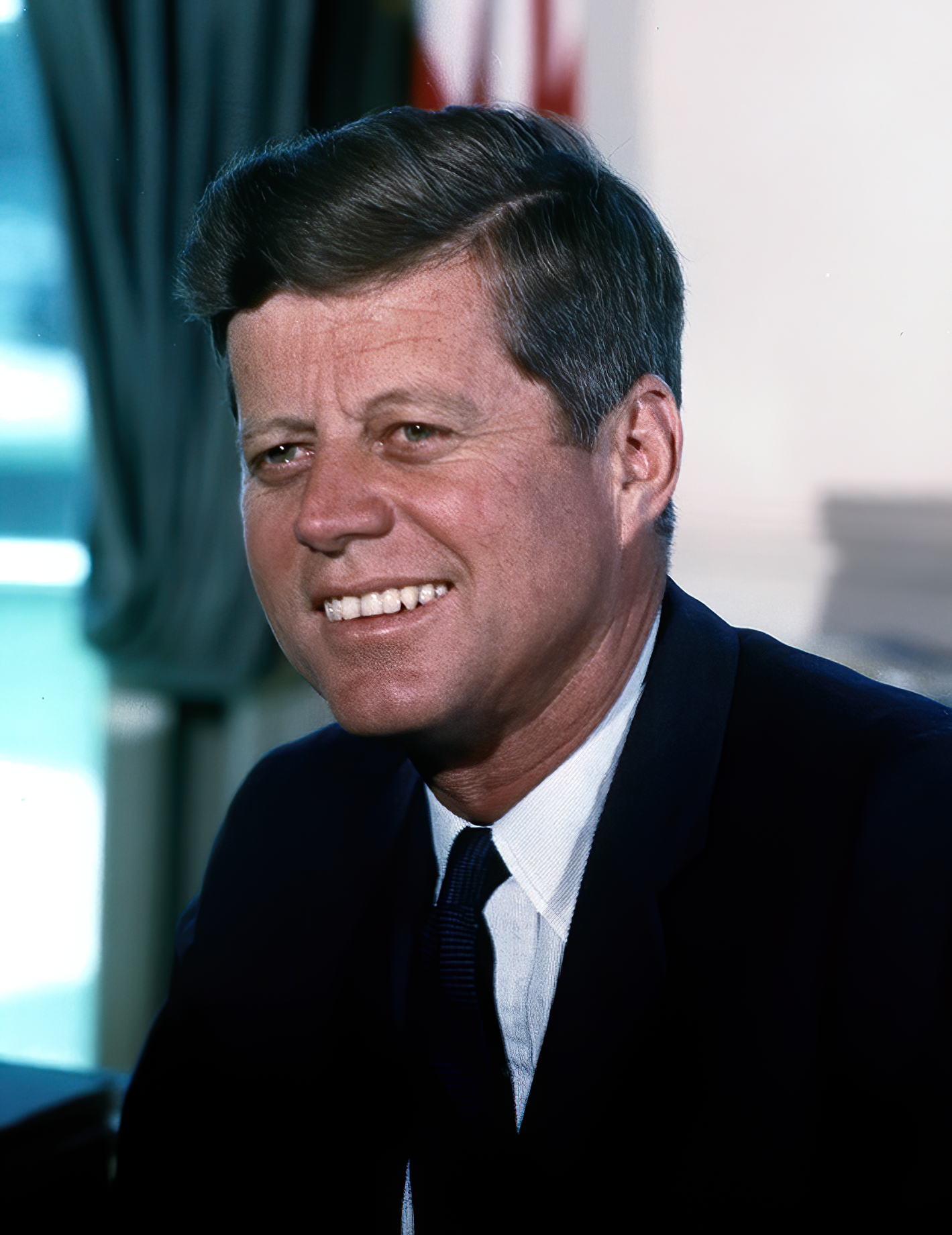
John F. Kennedy

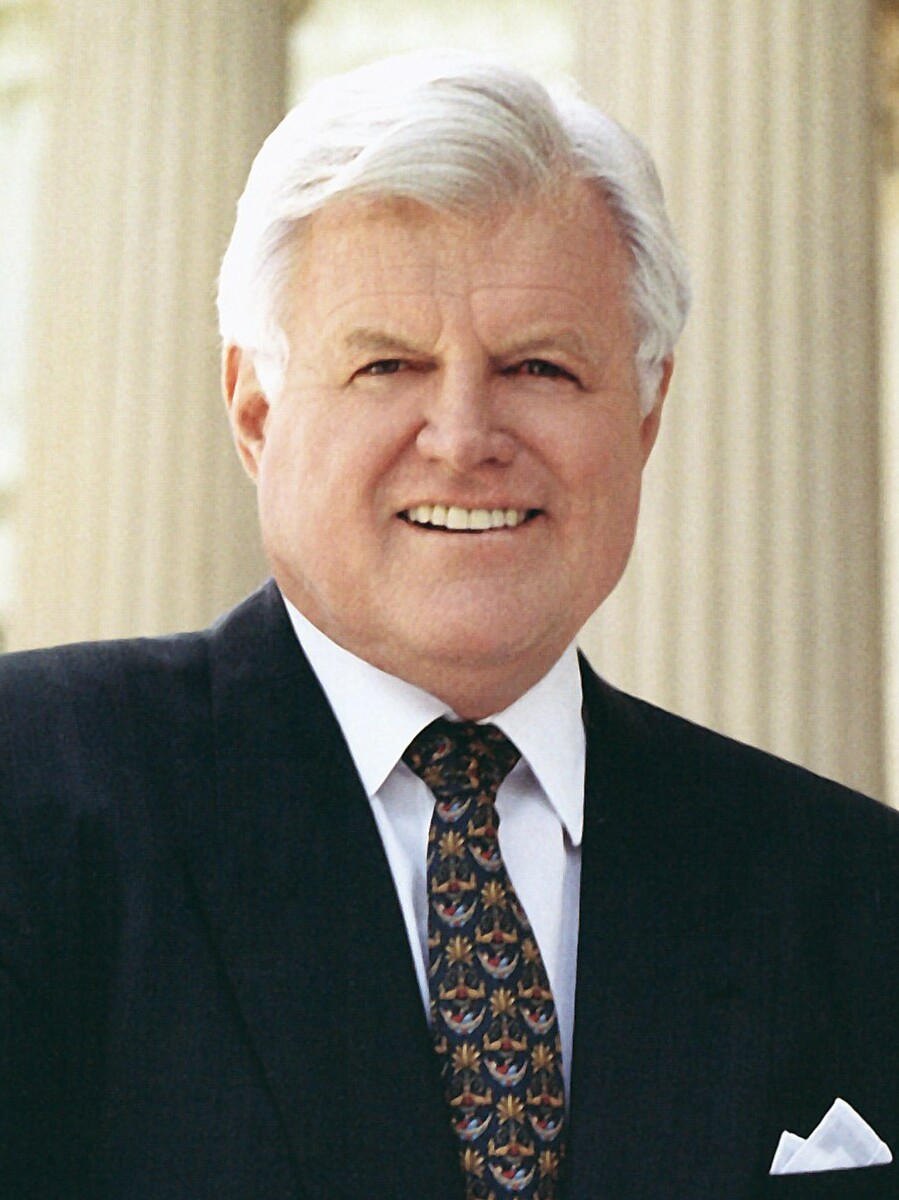
Ted Kennedy

- Patrick Joseph Kennedy: Massachusetts state Representative, 1884–1889; Massachusetts state Senator, 1889–1895.
  - Joseph Patrick Kennedy Sr.: Chairman of the U.S. Securities and Exchange Commission, 1934–1935; chairman of the United States Maritime Commission, 1936–1938; United States Ambassador to the United Kingdom, 1938–1940.
    - John Fitzgerald Kennedy: United States Representative from Massachusetts, 1947–1953; United States Senator from Massachusetts, 1953–1960; President of the United States, 1961–1963.
      - Caroline Kennedy: United States Ambassador to Japan, 2013–2017; United States Ambassador to Australia, 2022–2024.
    - Eunice Kennedy Shriver
      - Bobby Shriver: Santa Monica, California City Council member, 2004–2012; Mayor of Santa Monica, 2010.
      - Mark Kennedy Shriver: Maryland state Delegate, 1995–2003.
    - Robert Francis Kennedy: United States Attorney General, 1961–1964; United States Senator from New York, 1965–1968.
      - Kathleen Kennedy Townsend: Lieutenant governor of Maryland, 1995–2003. Advisor to U.S. Secretary of Labor, appointed 2021
      - Joseph P. Kennedy II: United States Representative from Massachusetts, 1987–1999.
        - Joseph P. Kennedy III: United States Representative from Massachusetts, 2013–2021; U.S. envoy to Northern Ireland, 2022–2024
      - Robert Francis Kennedy Jr.: United States Secretary of Health and Human Services, 2025–present.
    - Jean Kennedy Smith: United States Ambassador to Ireland, 1993–1998
      - William Kennedy Smith: Commissioner of the District of Columbia from district 2A04, 2015–2020
    - Edward Moore "Ted" Kennedy: United States Senator from Massachusetts, 1962–2009.
      - Edward M. Kennedy Jr.: Connecticut state Senator, 2015–2019.
      - Patrick J. Kennedy: Rhode Island state Representative, 1989–1993; United States Representative from Rhode Island, 1995–2011.

In addition, some Kennedy spouses have served in government:

- Andrew Cuomo (then-husband of Kerry Kennedy): United States Secretary of Housing and Urban Development, 1997–2001. After their divorce, he served as New York state attorney general (2007–2010) and New York governor (2011–2021).
- Victoria Reggie Kennedy (widow of Ted Kennedy): U.S. ambassador to Austria, 2022–2025
- Arnold Schwarzenegger (then-husband of Maria Shriver): governor of California, 2003–2011
- Sargent Shriver (husband of Eunice Kennedy Shriver): president of the Chicago Board of Education, 1955–1960; director of the Peace Corps, 1961–1966; director of the Office of Economic Opportunity, 1964–1968; U.S. ambassador to France, 1968–1970
- Amaryllis Fox Kennedy (wife of Robert F. Kennedy III): deputy director of National Intelligence, associate director of the Office of Management and Budget 2025–2026; and member of the President's Intelligence Advisory Board, 2025–present.

There was a member of the Kennedy family in public office nearly continuously from 1946, when John F. Kennedy was elected to the U.S. House of Representatives, until early 2011, when Patrick J. Kennedy left the House. The only exception was the period between John F. Kennedy's resignation from the Senate on December 22, 1960, and his assumption of the office of President on January 20, 1961. In 2013, two years after Patrick Kennedy left the House, Joseph P. Kennedy III was elected U.S. Representative from Massachusetts and served until 2021. Below is a timeline of the Kennedys' tenure in the U.S. government.

=== Timeline ===
- United States Congress
- United States Government
- United States Ambassador

== Heraldry ==
On March 17, 1961, John F. Kennedy was presented with a grant of arms for all the descendants of Patrick Kennedy (1823–1858) from the Chief Herald of Ireland. The design of the arms (three gold closed helmets on a black field) strongly alludes to symbols in the coats of arms of the O'Kennedys of Ormonde and the FitzGeralds of Desmond, from whom the family is descended. The crest is an armored hand holding four arrows between two olive branches, elements taken from the coat of arms of the United States of America and also symbolic of Kennedy and his brothers.

Coat of arms of the Kennedy family
Granted 1961 Armiger All the descendants of Patrick Kennedy (1823–1858) Crest Between two olive branches a cubit sinister arm in armor erect, the hand holding a sheaf of four arrows, points upward, all proper Escutcheon Sable three helmets in profile Or within a bordure per saltire Gules and Ermine.

== See also ==
- Kennedy curse
