= Swift, certain, and fair =

Approach to criminal-justice supervision

Swift, Certain, and Fair (SCF) is an approach to criminal-justice supervision involving probation, parole, pre-trial diversion, and/or incarceration.

== Features ==
SCF implementations typically have the following features:

- Limited set of rules
- Clear warnings
- Close monitoring
- Swift response to violations
- A modest consequence for every violation

== HOPE ==
One of the first SCF programs was Hawaii's Opportunity Probation with Enforcement (HOPE), created in Honolulu in 2004 by Judge Steven Alm.

In 2009 the program was evaluated by Angela Hawken and Mark Kleiman. They found that, compared with probationers supervised as usual, HOPE probationers were:

- 55% less likely to be arrested for a new crime
- 72% less likely to use drugs
- 61% less likely to skip appointments with their supervisory officer
- 53% less likely to have their probation revoked.

== Demonstration Field Experiment (DFE) ==
To assess the universality of the Hawaii results, the Bureau of Justice Assistance and National Institute of Justice funded a replication and randomized control trial at four mainland sites. Findings were expected by 2016.

== Other implementations ==
SCF programs have been implemented in at least 28 states and an American Indian nation.

== Other sources ==
- Bartels, L. (2015). "Swift and certain sanctions: Is it time for Australia to bring some HOPE into the criminal justice system?" (PDF). Criminal Law Journal. 39 (1): 53–66.
- Larkin, P. J. (2015). "Swift, Certain, and Fair Punishment—24/7 Sobriety and Hope: Creative Approaches to Alcohol-and Illicit Drug-Using Offenders". Journal of Criminal Law and Criminology: 105. SSRN 2465644.
- Skarbek, David (2014-10-01). "Prisonomics: Lessons from America's Mass Incarceration". Economic Affairs. 34 (3): 411–421. doi:10.1111/ecaf.12089. ISSN 1468-0270.
- Pepperdine and Department of Justice Announce Swift Certain Fair Resource Center
