= David Schutter =

Hawaiian attorney (1940–2005)

David C. Schutter

Personal details
- Born: David Christopher Schuetter; September 2, 1940 Appleton, Wisconsin, U.S.
- Died: July 10, 2005 (aged 64) Kailua, Honolulu County, Hawaii, U.S.
- Party: Democratic
- Spouses: Carole Whang Schutter (m. 1977–1992); Patrice Kashiwai (m. 1971–1976)
- Children: 4
- Education: Marquette University (BA); University of Wisconsin (JD)
- Occupation: Lawyer

Military service
- Allegiance: United States of America
- Branch/service: Arizona Army National Guard
- Years of service: 1968-1969
- Rank: Corporal
- Battles/wars: Vietnam War

David C. Schutter (1940-2005) was a Honolulu criminal defense attorney and civil litigator. He was noted for his flamboyant courtroom persona and involvement in high-profile legal cases in Hawaii during the 1970s and 1980s.

== Early life ==
Schutter was born and raised in Appleton, Wisconsin, the son of successful insurance salesman Karl Schuetter and his wife Pearl Balliet Schuetter. He attended Appleton High School, serving in the student council and as senior class president. He was also a top athlete who lettered in basketball, track, and baseball and served as a Badger Boys State delegate.

Schutter attended Marquette University in 1958 and graduated cum laude less than four years later. He then attended University of Wisconsin's law school, graduating at the top of his class and also obtaining a Master's of Arts (MA) from Arizona State University.

His brief career at the law firm of Lewis Roca Rothgerber Christie (then just 'Lewis & Roca LLP') in Phoenix, Arizona was interrupted when he was enlisted in the Arizona National Guard (the 277th Military Intelligence Detachment) and was deployed to Hawaii as a corporal. Schutter was then deployed to Vietnam, where he served at the Tây Ninh Combat Base, after an unsuccessful federal lawsuit that he filed to prevent his unit from being sent overseas. He was originally billeted to serve as a combat infantryman but was reclassified as a prison interrogator after the intervention of Patsy Mink and Morris Udall. His service only lasted a few months, and he was released in Oakland, California in August 1969.

Following his return to Hawaii in the same year, he left the Guard to start his own law firm.

== Legal career ==
Schutter began his career in the 1970s. His early career focused on civil litigation. Throughout his decades-long career, he worked with many prominent civil attorneys, including future-governor Ben Cayetano, criminal defense attorney F. Lee Bailey (late of the O. J. Simpson trial's "dream team"), and Miranda v. Arizona lead counsels John P. Frank and John Flynn. He also mentored attorney Steven Levinson, who would later become an Associate Justice of the Supreme Court of Hawaii.

=== Prominent cases ===
==== "Wild Bill" Thoresen (1968) ====
Schutter's first big case while at Lewis & Roca was defending the eccentric San Francisco millionaire William Thoresen and his wife who were facing federal firearms charges. This case arose following an ATF raid on the Thoresen mansion in San Francisco, which revealed a wide array of weapons including handguns, machine guns, bayonets, and even anti-aircraft weapons.

==== Randall Saito (1979) ====
Schutter represented Randall Saito, a 21-year-old man who was charged with murdering a 29-year-old woman in front of Ala Moana Center parking lot in July 1979. After a hearing in 1981 (two years after the murder), Schutter successfully secured a verdict of not guilty by mental disease or defect for Saito. Saito had been diagnosed with sexual sadism and necrophilia (a sexual attraction to corpses). Upon Saito's sentencing, Schutter remarked:

I think Randall Saito will be in the state mental hospital or whatever facility they assign him for a long, long time, and by long, long time I’m referring to long after my death.

In 2017, over ten years after Schutter's death, Saito escaped from the Hawaii State Hospital where he was being held for treatment. Saito was rearrested in California three days later and found competent to stand trial on a charge of escape. According to a report by the Hawaii State Attorney General, the escape was attributable to lax oversight.

In the mid 2010s, Saito's case was featured in the My Favorite Murder podcast.

==== The Sante Kimes maids trial (1982) ====
Schutter was the lead plaintiffs' attorney in the lawsuit against notorious grifter Sante Kimes after she was accused and convicted of keeping a large series of undocumented immigrants from Mexico as slaves in the 1980s. He succeeded in winning a large judgment against her and her insurance company following her conviction on federal criminal charges arising out of the same incidents.

==== Whitaker v University of Hawai'i (1991) ====
Schutter represented student athlete Terry Whitaker, who was suspended from the University of Hawaii football team without due process after an off-campus altercation. Whitaker was suspended without any hearing or other formal disciplinary proceeding, a decision which Schutter claimed violated Whitaker's right to due process as well as the university's internal procedures In a landmark decision, a state court judge ordered the university to reinstate Whitaker, a decision that sent shock waves throughout the state which was at the time grappling with racial discrimination against African Americans during the 1980s and 1990s.

==== Larry Mehau ====
Schutter represented Larry Mehau, a Hawaiian businessman who was long suspected of being connected to organized crime in Hawaii. Mehau had filed a libel suit against a newspaper editor, Rick Reed, who had published an article suggesting that Mehau was the "godfather" of organized crime in Hawaii and linked to two murders. The suit also named several mainstream media outlets as well as Hawaii State House Minority Leader. Kamalii obtained a court order forcing the State of Hawaii to pay for her defense. She was then represented by David Turk who had previously worked for and been trained by Schutter. While the case continued for years Schutter finally dropped the case against Kamalii.

Schutter also accused Honolulu prosecutor Charles Marsland of waging an "orchestrated campaign" and a "political vendetta" against Mehau and his associate, then-Governor of Hawaii Ryoichi Ariyoshi in the form of criminal charges against some of Mehau's employees and associates. Schutter also defended Mehau in a campaign finance case related to his contributions to Ariyoshi's gubernatorial campaign.

== Political advocacy ==
Schutter founded a not-for-profit entity called the Schutter Foundation in 1981. The Foundation received its initial funding via a $25,000 gift from Schutter. Its ten-member board included Wallace Fujiyama, a member of the University of Hawaii Board of Regents; Mufi Hanneman, a special assistant to then-Hawaii Governor George Ariyoshi; Dr. Gregory Mark, chairman of Chaminade University's criminal justice department; Ah Quon McElrath, a labor activist; Wayne Matsuo, an educational specialist; Tom Naki, a member of the prosecutors' office; Marc Oley, a criminal justice planner and retired Honolulu police officer; Julianne Puzon, a staffer in the Governor's office; Rev. Jory Watland, a pastor; and Mike Keller, a former Honolulu Advertiser reporter, who also serves as executive director.

The stated goal of the Foundation was to advocate for criminal justice reform and to encourage the Hawaii legislature to ban handguns. Mike Keller, the executive director of the Schutter Foundation, criticized the Hawaii police and prosecution services, claiming that their 94% conviction rate was misleading and asserted that reforms were needed of the prosecutors' office to improve outcomes for crime victims.

The Schutter Foundation was prominently involved in a 1980s political battle to pass a handgun ban in Hawaii. It sponsored a rally of about 200 gun control in February 1982 supporters to protest; the protest was attended by gun control artist and musician Harry Nilsson, and was in support of a bill that would prohibit the private possession of a handgun, with exceptions for authorized military and law enforcement personnel. Handgun owners could keep their guns stored at a gun range, and inoperable or antique guns would not be covered by the ban.

== Death ==
Schutter died on July 10, 2005, a month after suffering a massive stroke. He was survived by his stepdaughter and his four sons. In 2015, his 18,000 sq. foot beachfront mansion on Kahala Avenue (Honolulu) was sold to a new owner, who planned to demolish it.
