= SCF =

SCF (or scf) may refer to:

== Associations and organizations ==
- Saba Conservation Foundation, an NGO on the Caribbean island of Saba
- Sahara Conservation Fund, an international NGO
- Scientific Committee on Food, a former committee of the European Commission
- Scheduled Castes Federation, a political party in India
- Singapore Chess Federation
- Singapore Canoe Federation
- Société Chimique de France (Chemical Society of France)
- Save the Children Fund, an international NGO
- Southern Cross Fertilisers
- Swedish Cycling Federation
- SC Freiburg, German football club

== In science and technology ==
- Self-consistent field, an approach used in Hartree–Fock methods in quantum systems
- Service Control Function in a telecommunications network
- Small carbonaceous fossil
- SCF-complex (Skp1/Cul1/F-box complex), a ubiquitin ligase
- Supercritical fluid
- Standard cubic foot of gas
- Stem cell factor, a cytokine

== Financial ==
- Survey of Consumer Finances, a triennial statistical survey in the US
- Supply chain finance

== Other ==
- Stechford railway station, West Midlands, station code
- Salem Cricket Foundation Stadium, Tamil Nadu, India
- Sectional center facility, United States Postal Service
- South Central Farm, an urban farm and community garden located in South Los Angeles, California operating 1994–2006
- Southern Cathedrals Festival, a 5-day music festival in England
- Sovcomflot, a Russian shipping company
- State College of Florida, Manatee–Sarasota
- Swift, certain, and fair, an approach to criminal-justice supervision
