= Ah Quon McElrath =

Social activist in Hawaii

Ah Quon McElrath (15 December 1915 – 11 December 2008) was a Hawaii labor reform leader and social activist. She retired in 1981, but spent her career advocating for unions by pushing for equal pay and treatment from the Big Five in Hawaii.

== Early life ==
McElrath was born Leong Yuk Quon in Iwilei after her parents immigrated to Hawaii from Zhongshan, China. Her father worked many small jobs, and died when McElrath was 5 years old. After her father's death, McElrath and her siblings worked in pineapple canneries.

At age 17, McElrath went to a burlesque theater to hear Upton Sinclair, a famed muckraker, give a speech on poverty. This speech was her inspiration to become a social activist.

She married Robert "Bob" McElrath in 1941.

== Career and activism ==
While enrolled in the University of Hawaiʻi, Ah Quon McElrath joined the leftist Interprofessional Association and met Communist Party USA leader Jack Hall, who was the head of the International Longshore and Warehouse Union (ILWU) Local 142.

After graduation she worked at the Board of Public Welfare.

McElrath started volunteering for the ILWU in the 1940s by making speeches and signing up dockworkers as union members. She volunteered her skills as a social worker widely, such as in the aftermath of the 1946 tsunami in Hilo. While on leave, she also became involved with the sugar strike of 1946, teaching strikers what rights they were entitled to.

In 1954 she became a paid union social worker with the ILWU, and worked there she retired in 1981. In 1981, she served on the board of a civil rights advocacy organization founded by Hawaii defense attorney David Schutter.

== Communism links ==
In 1971, the FBI released information naming the Central Committee of the Communist Party USA in Hawaii. Aside from McElrath, the list included Jack Hall, Jack Denichi Kimoto, John Reinecke, and Robert McElrath. Hall, Kimoto, Reinecke, and four others were put on trial for violating the Smith Act.

== Retirement ==
After retirement, McElrath continued to advocate for the poor, women's rights, education, and health care. For two years after retirement she worked with the Villers Foundation to improve the Supplemental Security Income program. She also served on the Board of Regents at the University of Hawaiʻi, and helped to create the Ethnic Studies department there. McElrath received an honorary doctorate from the university in 1988 and the UH Founders Alumni Association Lifetime Achievement Award in 2004.

McElrath died in 2008.
