= Angela Hawken =

University Professor

Personal details
- Born: 1971 (age 54–55) Cape Town, South Africa
- Education: University of Witwatersrand Pardee RAND Graduate School
- Profession: Professor, Public Policy

Academic work
- Discipline: Economics, public policy

Angela Hawken is a South African academic at Johns Hopkins University. She previously served as a professor of public policy and the director of the Marron Institute of Urban Management at New York University. Her research focuses primarily on drugs, crime, and corruption, and combines experimental and quantitative methods.

She has had a leadership role in evaluations of Hawaii's Opportunity Probation with Enforcement (HOPE) program, an innovative initiative aimed at reducing crime and drug use, which is becoming a model for other states.

== Career ==
Hawken was a faculty member at the University of the Witwatersrand in Johannesburg, South Africa, before moving to the United States in 1998. After receiving her PhD in policy analysis at the Frederick S. Pardee RAND Graduate School, she joined the School of Public Policy at Pepperdine University.

Hawken conducted the statewide cost-benefit analysis of California Proposition 36, which produced its final report in 2008.

Hawken also led the randomized controlled trial of Hawaii's Opportunity Probation with Enforcement program. This program was initiated by Judge Steven Alm in 2004. Its distinctive feature is that it seeks to reduce crime and drug use through a swift-and-certain-sanctions model to manage high-risk probationers. Interest in the HOPE program has led to hearings on Capitol Hill, and discussions in the White House. The US Drug Czar Gil Kerlikowske identified HOPE as the most promising initiative that "not only prevents recidivism, but also actively assists individuals to transition to productive lives." President Obama's proposed budget for fiscal year 2014 provides $10 million for HOPE probation.

Hawken consults regularly for the United States Department of State and the United Nations. She advised the Georgian Foundation for Strategic and International Studies (GFSIS), a State Department-supported think tank in Tbilisi, Georgia. She worked for the State Department on counternarcotics policy for Afghanistan. She wrote background papers for United Nations Development Programme (UNDP) regional reports on Asia and the Pacific, developing measurement instruments on corruption and gender equality. She also worked with the UNDP on a system to monitor corruption in Afghanistan.

== Selected publications ==
Books

- Marijuana Legalization: What Everyone Needs to Know (with Jonathan P. Caulkins, Beau Kilmer and Mark A.R. Kleiman) (Oxford University Press, 2012).
- Drugs and Drug Policy: What Everyone Needs to Know (with Mark Kleiman and Jonathan Caulkins) (Oxford University Press, 2011).

Articles, Chapters and Working Papers

- "Cross-National Indices with Gender-Differentiated Data: What Do They Measure? How Valid Are They?" (with Gerardo L. Munck) Social Indicators Research Vol. 111, Nº 3 (2013): 801–38. [An earlier version, with the same title, was prepared for the Asia-Pacific Human Development Report Background Paper Series 2010/01.
- "Does the Evaluator Make a Difference? Measurement Validity in Corruption Research," (with Gerardo L. Munck) Political Concepts Working Paper Series # 48 (International Political Science Association [IPSA], Committee on Concepts and Methods, 2011).
- "The Message from Hawaii: HOPE for Probation," Perspectives Vol. 34, Nº 3 (2010): 36–49.
- "Measuring Corruption. A Critical Assessment and a Proposal," pp. 71–106 (with Gerardo L. Munck), in Anuradha K. Rajivan and Ramesh Gampat (eds.), Perspectives on Corruption and Human Development Vol. 1 (New Delhi: Macmillan India for UNDP, 2009).
- "Methamphetamine and Crime," pp. 157–71 (with David Farabee), in John M. Roll, Richard Rawson, Walter Ling, and Steven Shoptaw (eds.), Methamphetamine Addiction: From Basic Science to Treatment (New York: Guilford Press, 2009).

Reports and Short Articles

- "A Voter's Guide to Legalizing Marijuana," (with Jonathan P. Caulkins, Beau Kilmer and Mark A.R. Kleiman) The American Interest (November–December 2012).
- "Eight Questions for Drug Policy Research," (with Jonathan P. Caulkins, Beau Kilmer and Mark A.R. Kleiman) Issues in Science and Technology Vol. 28. Nº 4 (2012).
- Managing Drug Involved Probationers with Swift and Certain Sanctions: Evaluating Hawaii's HOPE, (with Mark Kleiman) (National Institute of Justice, Office of Justice Programs, US Department of Justice, 2012).
- "Treatment for All Means Real Treatment for Few," (with Jeremy Grunert) Offender Programs Report Vol. 13, Nº 6 (2010): 81–96.
- "Behavioral Triage: A New Model for Identifying and Treating Substance-Abusing Offenders," Journal of Drug Policy Analysis Vol. 3, Nº 1 (2010): 1–5.
- "The Message from Hawaii: HOPE for Probation," Perspectives Vol. 34, Nº 3 (2010): 36–49.
- "HOPE for Probation: How Hawaii Improved Behavior with High-Probability, Low-Severity Sanctions" Journal of Global Drug Policy and Practice Vol. 4, Nº 3 (2010): 1–5.
- Evaluation of Proposition 36: The Substance Abuse and Crime Prevention Act of 2000. Final Report, (with Darren Urada et al.) (Los Angeles: UCLA, 2008).
- "H.O.P.E. For Reform," (with Mark Kleiman) American Prospect (April 2007): 1–2.
