= Professional association =

Organization promoting a specific profession

A professional association (also called a professional body, professional organization, or professional society) is a group that usually seeks to further a particular profession, the interests of individuals and organisations engaged in that profession, and the public interest. In the United States, such an association is typically a nonprofit business league for tax purposes. In the UK, they may take a variety of legal forms.

== Roles ==
The roles of professional associations have been variously defined: "A group of people in a learned occupation who are entrusted with maintaining control or oversight of the legitimate practice of the occupation;" also a body acting "to safeguard the public interest;" organizations which "represent the interest of the professional practitioners," and so "act to maintain their own privileged and powerful position as a controlling body." Professional associations are ill defined although often have commonality in purpose and activities. In the UK the Science Council defines a professional body as "an organisation with individual members practicing a profession or occupation in which the organisation maintains an oversight of the knowledge, skills, conduct and practice of that profession or occupation". The Quality Assurance Agency distinguishes between statutory bodies and regulators that "have powers mandated by Parliament to regulate a profession or group of professions and protect the use of professional titles" and professional bodies that "are independent membership organisations that oversee the activities of a particular profession and represent the interests of [their] members" and which "may offer registration or certification of unregulated occupations on a voluntary basis."

Many professional bodies are involved in accrediting degrees, defining and examining the skills and competencies necessary to practice, and granting professional certifications to indicate that a person is qualified in the subject area.

Many professional bodies also act as learned societies for the academic disciplines underlying their professions, such as the American Statistical Association.

== See also ==
- Advocacy
- Affinity group
- Bar association
- Guild
- Inter-professional association
- Licensure
- List of international professional associations
- List of professional associations in the United Kingdom
- Professional order
- Regulatory college
- Syndicate
- Trade association
- Trade union
- Working group
