= Kevin Sabet =

American scholar and former government advisor

Kevin A. Sabet
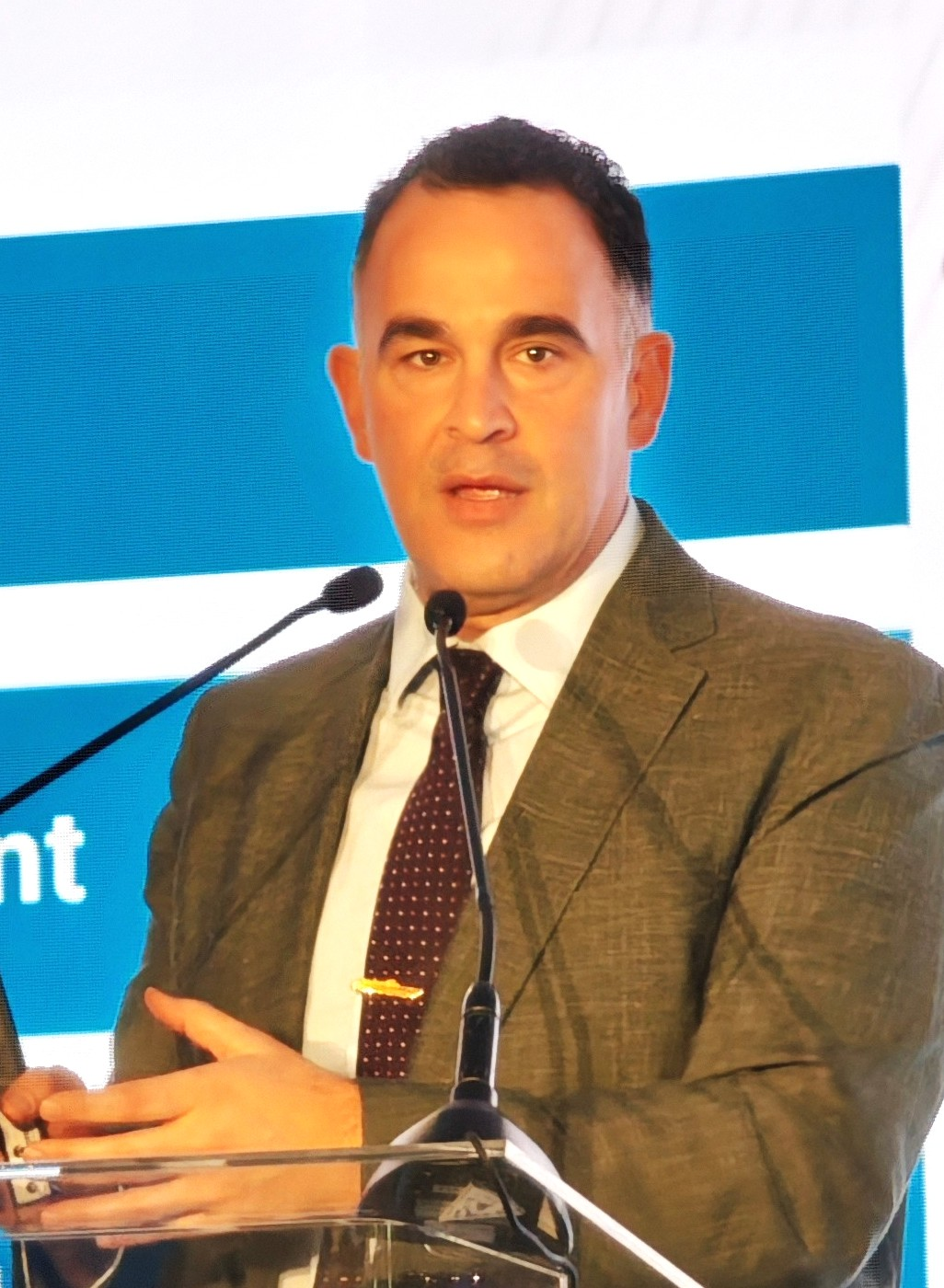
- Speaking at MCC Budapest Summit, 2025
- Born: 1979 (age 46–47); Ft. Wayne, Indiana, US
- Known for: Founding Smart Approaches to Marijuana; Opposing marijuana legalization
- Awards: Marshall Scholarship, Nils Bejerot Award for Global Drug Prevention, John P. McGovern Award

Academic background
- Education: University of California, Berkeley; Oxford University
- Doctoral advisor: George Smith
- Other advisors: Bruce Cain; William "Sandy" Muir
- Influences: David F. Musto; Robert L. DuPont

Academic work
- Discipline: drug policy, public policy, journalism
- Institutions: The White House, ONDCP, Yale University, University of Florida, SAM

Kevin Abraham Sabet is an American drug policy scholar who served as a White House Office of National Drug Control Policy advisor. He is the only person appointed to that office in both Republican (George W. Bush) and Democratic (Barack Obama and Bill Clinton) administrations. Sabet has previously been an assistant professor adjunct at Yale University Medical School's Institution for Social and Policy Studies, and a columnist at Newsweek.

With Patrick J. Kennedy, Sabet co-founded Smart Approaches to Marijuana in Denver in January 2013, which has emerged as the leading opponent of marijuana legalization in the United States. Upon founding SAM, Salon called Sabet "the quarterback of the new anti-drug movement" and NBC News called him a "prodigy of drug politics". Rolling Stone called him one of marijuana legalization's biggest enemies. The Wall Street Journal profiled Sabet for their Weekend Interview in July 2026.

Sabet is the author of numerous articles and monographs including the book Reefer Sanity: Seven Great Myths About Marijuana, now in its second edition, and Smokescreen, is distributed by Simon & Schuster. Smokescreen was optioned for a documentary by Justin Baldoni's Wayfarer Studios for the film, THC Inc., distributed by the Documentary+ platform. His third book One Nation Under the Influence, was published by Wiley and Polity, in the US in September 2025, and received advance praise from David Sheff and others.

Sabet is the recipient of the Nils Bejerot Award given in conjunction with Queen Silvia of Sweden and was one of four Americans (along with Jonathan Caulkins, Bertha Madras, and Robert DuPont) invited to advise Pope Francis by the Vatican's Pontifical Academy of Sciences to discuss marijuana and other drug policy. He spoke in front of Jeff Bezos, Mark Zuckerberg, Warren Buffett, and others at the Allen and Company Sun Valley Investor's Conference in 2018 and is a regular attendee; he was seen at Sun Valley in one of his first public appearances since 2020 with Zuckerberg and Sheryl Sandberg in 2021.

== Education ==
Sabet is a graduate of the University of California, Berkeley and Oxford University, where he received his Doctorate in social policy as a Marshall Scholar.

== Drug policy advocacy ==
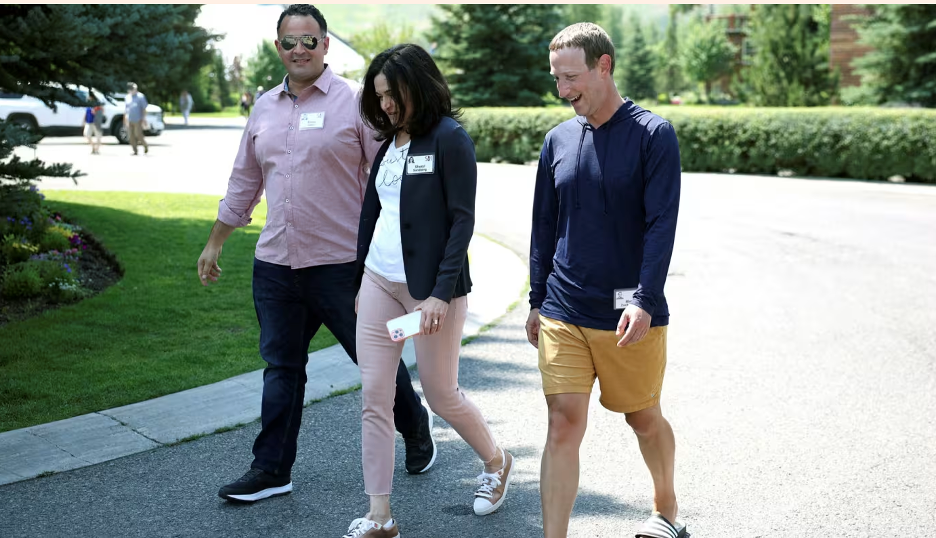
Kevin Sabet, Mark Zuckerberg, and Sheryl Sandberg, at the Allen & Company Sun Valley Conference in 2022

Sabet began his activism as a teenager, campaigning against the abolition of after-school programs sought by the libertarian-leaning Orange County school board. During his freshman year at the University of California, Berkeley, Sabet started Citizens for a Drug-Free Berkeley and worked to educate his peers on the "wave of destruction" that comes with club drugs, including MDMA. He has testified for the US Congress, Canadian Parliament, UK Parliament, Italian Parliament, and UN bodies multiple times. He has been an invited witness at the U.S. Senate on marijuana issues generally, and cannabidiol.

Sabet has written on the need for prevention, treatment, and enforcement to guide drug policy, although he has also argued for abolishing severe sentencing guidelines, like mandatory minimum laws. His articles have been published in newspapers, such as The Washington Post and The New York Times. He has argued for removing criminal penalties for low-level marijuana use, though steadfastly opposes legalization while supporting continued civil penalties for use, along with mandated treatment. He supports charges for manufacturing or selling large amounts of cannabis.

Through the work of SAM, Sabet has been an active voice in successful campaigns to stop marijuana legalization initiatives in Ohio (2015), and legislative initiatives in New Jersey, New York, Connecticut, and other states. In New Jersey, Sabet and SAM have partnered with senators, including Senator Ronald Rice, pastors, community organizers, and other public health and safety advocates to resist Governor Phil Murphy's push to commercialize marijuana in the state. This resistance was ultimately unsuccessful after Question 1 was approved by voters in November 2020 and enacted the following February.

In the 2018 legislative sessions, Sabet and SAM were active with coalitions in successful efforts to defeat marijuana legalization and commercialization bills in Illinois, New Hampshire, and Vermont. While Vermont decriminalized marijuana possession in 2013 and allowed for personal use and "home-grow" in 2018, Sabet and SAM have worked with partners to defeat outright commercialization such as seen in Colorado, California, and Washington (Vermont later legalized commercial marijuana sales in October 2020 despite SAM's opposition). In North Dakota, Sabet and SAM allies campaigned against a ballot measure to legalize cannabis that was defeated.

Prior to SAM's founding, Sabet wrote op-eds and spoke across the United States. Some say Sabet is arguably the most influential person in the movement against cannabis legalization in the United States.

Sabet has also organized coalition letters to various administrations regarding the central role of Office of National Drug Control Policy in policy making, and produced a video for Biden transition advisors. Smart Approaches to Marijuana helped support efforts to roll back supposed cannabis industry influence in Colorado, tightening current medical and recreational laws.

SAM has campaigned against marijuana legalization ballot initiatives in multiple states with mixed results. The organization claimed victory in Ohio (2015), though Ohio later approved legalization in 2023. SAM invested heavily in Arizona's 2016 campaign, where Proposition 205 was defeated; however, Arizona voters approved legalization in 2020. In Michigan (2018), SAM reportedly invested approximately $1.7 million opposing Proposal 1, which nonetheless passed. New Jersey voters approved legalization in 2020 despite SAM's opposition.

== Funding and Transparency ==
SAM's funding sources have been a subject of controversy. According to New York State lobbying records, SAM spent $84,795 lobbying against legalization in the first half of 2019. The organization reportedly sought to keep its donor list confidential, claiming donors would face harassment; however, the New York State ethics commission denied this request, despite there being no "smoking gun." Some critics allege connections between SAM's funding and federal drug enforcement grants.

== Books and writings ==
His new book, One Nation Under the Influence: America’s Deadly Drug Habit and How We Can Overcome It, "offers effective solutions to the drug crisis, taking readers all over the country—from the streets of San Francisco and New York to the Southern Border and even Canada to show a new way forward." It has received significant advance praise. David Sheff has said, "Kevin Sabet has dedicated his life to understanding America’s drug problem and finding solutions. One Nation Under the Influence is the result: a groundbreaking account that’s sorely needed at a time when we’re losing so many of our loved ones to overdose and addiction.” Former three-time drug czar Robert DuPont calls the book Sabet's "magnum opus--the book he has always threatened to write." Keith Humphreys called it "a wide-ranging analysis of our country’s drug problem by one of its most influential drug policy advocates.”

His 2021 book, Smokescreen: What the Marijuana Industry Doesn't Want You to Know, was released April 20, 2021. According to its description on Amazon, it contains "interviews with industry insiders who reveal the hidden dangers of a product they had once worshipped" and "tragic stories of those who have suffered and died as a result of marijuana use, and in many cases, as a result of its mischaracterization." Sabet claims that the marijuana industry is putting profits over public health and endangering the American people with dangerously potent products.

His first book, Reefer Sanity: Seven Great Myths About Marijuana, is now in its second edition. Ryan Grim of The Intercept noted, "For backers of legalization, Sabet is dangerous, because he can't be easily dismissed as a reefer-madness-style propagandist. The marijuana reform community should play close attention to his arguments, and the prohibitionists, if they have any plans to reverse the tide, should do the same." Commentator and marijuana legalization opponent David Frum wrote, "Compassionate and knowledgeable, Kevin Sabet is the most important new voice in the American drug policy debate. Policymakers, parents, and concerned citizens should heed his meticulously factual case against marijuana legalization." In contrast, Phillip Smith of Stop the Drug War harshly criticized Sabet's claims and his "willingness to use the coercive power of the state to make us conform to his vision of the public health."

Sabet also co-edited Contemporary Health Issues on Marijuana, published by Oxford, which was highlighted by Jane Brody in The New York Times.
