= Joan Bennett Kennedy =

American musician and socialite (1936–2025)

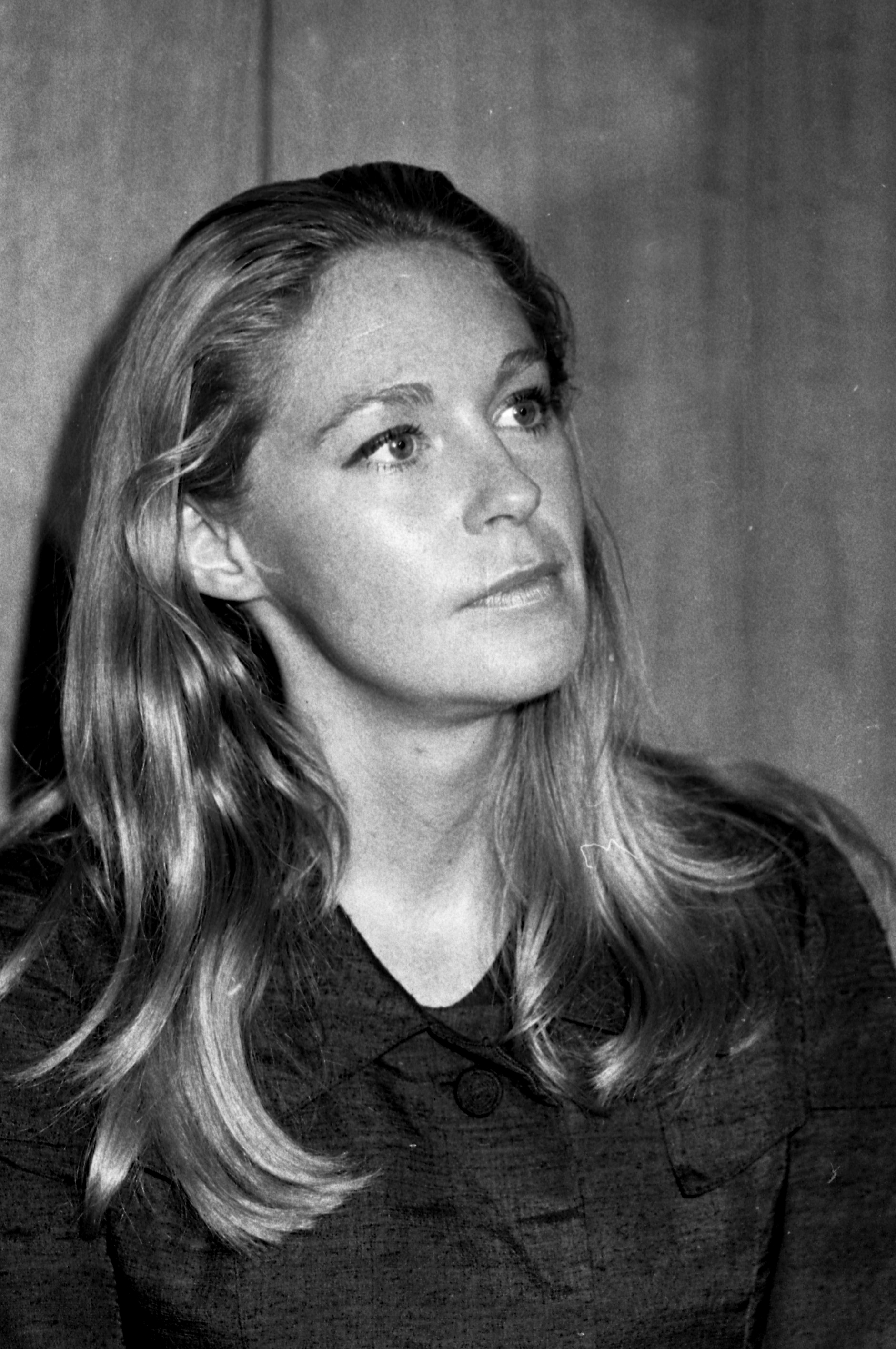
- Kennedy in 1971
- Born: Virginia Joan Bennett; September 2, 1936; New York City, New York, U.S.
- Died: October 8, 2025 (aged 89); Boston, Massachusetts, U.S.
- Education: Manhattanville College (BA); Lesley University (MA)
- Political party: Democratic
- Spouse: Ted Kennedy (m. 1958; div. 1982)
- Children: Kara; Edward Jr.; Patrick II

Virginia Joan Bennett Kennedy (September 2, 1936 – October 8, 2025) was an American socialite, author, and advocate. Kennedy was the first wife of U.S. Senator Ted Kennedy. In 1992, she published a guide to classical music and later became associated with mental health awareness, drawing public attention to addiction and recovery through her own experiences. Kennedy also worked as a classical pianist, performing at public concerts.

== Early life ==
Virginia Joan Bennett was born on September 2, 1936, at Mother Cabrini Hospital in New York City to Virginia Joan Stead and Harry Wiggin Bennett Jr. She had a younger sister named Candace ("Candy"), and was raised in a Roman Catholic family in suburban Bronxville, New York. Their father was a graduate of Cornell University and was president of the Joseph Katz Company, a New York advertising agency. She attended Manhattanville College (then a Sacred Heart college), in Purchase, New York. Manhattanville was also the alma mater of her future mother-in-law Rose Kennedy and future sisters-in-law Jean Kennedy Smith and Ethel Skakel Kennedy. In 1982, Bennett received an MA in Education from Lesley College (later Lesley University). As a teenager, she worked as a model in television advertising.

== Marriage, family, and divorce ==
In October 1957, at the dedication of a gymnasium at Manhattanville College in memory of another Kennedy sister, Kathleen – who had died in a plane crash in France in 1948 – Jean Kennedy Smith introduced Joan to her younger brother Edward (a.k.a. Ted), then a student at the University of Virginia School of Law in Charlottesville. The couple became engaged quickly and Joan grew nervous about marrying someone she did not know well. His father Joseph P. Kennedy Sr. insisted that the wedding should proceed, and they were married on November 29, 1958, at the St. Joseph's Church in Bronxville, New York. The small family wedding was held just a few weeks after Ted's older brother United States Senator John F. Kennedy won his landslide re-election for his United States Senate seat representing Massachusetts in 1958. They had three children: Kara Kennedy (1960–2011), Edward M. Kennedy Jr. (Ted Jr.) (b. 1961), and Patrick J. Kennedy (b. 1967).

Two of their children were cancer victims. Ted Jr. developed bone cancer at age 12, which resulted in the removal of a portion of his right leg in 1973, and Kara was treated for lung cancer in 2003; Kara died of a heart attack at the age of 51 on September 16, 2011.

Ted suffered a severe back injury in a 1964 airplane crash while campaigning for his first full Senate term. Joan assumed his campaign appearance duties during his successful re-election bid. He had previously won a special election in November 1962 to serve the remaining two years of his brother John F. Kennedy's Senate term, following John's resignation upon his election as the 35th President of the United States in November 1960.

In July 1969, Ted was involved in a car accident at a bridge on Chappaquiddick Island in Massachusetts that resulted in the death of his passenger, Mary Jo Kopechne. Although pregnant, and having been confined to bed in the wake of two previous miscarriages, Joan attended Kopechne's funeral. Three days later, she stood beside her husband in a local court when he pled guilty to leaving the scene of an accident. She suffered a third miscarriage shortly thereafter.

In 1970, Kennedy would perform a piano recital with the Philadelphia Orchestra that won her standing ovations and stellar reviews. Throughout the years, Kennedy would continue to appear in concert halls all over the world, performing a wide range of classical compositions under the batons of many of the leading conductors of the era, including Boston’s own Arthur Fiedler, Seiji Ozawa, and John Williams, and made friends with many of the most famous figures in the classical music world. During performances for the Boston Pops Orchestra, Kennedy would also at times narrate Sergei Prokofiev's Peter and the Wolf.

The couple separated in 1978 after twenty years of marriage. Around this time, Kennedy gave interviews to People and McCall's magazines discussing her struggles with alcoholism. She described using alcohol to cope with unhappiness and social pressure, and spoke openly about her recovery through the Alcoholics Anonymous twelve-step program. Despite their separation, they remained legally married during his failed 1980 U.S. presidential campaign. They later announced plans to divorce in 1981; the divorce was granted in 1982.

== Later life and death ==
In 1992, she published the book The Joy of Classical Music: A Guide for You and Your Family. Kennedy worked with children's charities, remained an accomplished pianist, and taught classical music to children.

Kennedy's later years were shaped by chronic alcoholism, which developed during her marriage. The alcohol problem escalated with sporadic, uneven sobriety, repeated drunk-driving arrests, court-ordered rehabilitation, and a return to drinking. This ultimately led to kidney damage, with the possibility of dialysis and protracted complications. As a result of her continued alcoholism, Kennedy would be appointed a guardian in the early 2000s. In July 2004, her son, Ted Jr. was appointed her legal guardian; in 2005, her children were granted temporary guardianship. That year she was hospitalized with a concussion and a broken shoulder after being found lying in a Boston street near her home. In 2005, she requested that her cousin, financial planner Webster E. Janssen of Connecticut, establish a trust to control her estate. This was in violation of her sons' guardianship. Kennedy's children later took successful legal action against Janssen, removing him as trustee and later filing a complaint against him with the U.S. Securities and Exchange Commission. That October, she was diagnosed with breast cancer and underwent surgery. She agreed to strict court-ordered guardianship and her estate was subsequently placed in a new trust overseen by two court-appointed trustees.

Apart from a brief relationship shortly after her divorce, she never remarried or pursued another relationship. She attended Ted's funeral at the Our Lady of Perpetual Help Basilica in Boston.

In her final years, Kennedy would live a quiet life in Boston and opted to stay relatively out of the public eye. Her last public appearance was with the extended Kennedy family at their annual Fourth of July gathering, three months before her death.

Kennedy died in her sleep at her home in Boston on October 8, 2025, at the age of 89. A death certificate listed her cause of death as dementia. Her alcoholism was described being "in remission" at the time. Public visitation was held for Kennedy on October 14, at Carr Funeral Home in Charlestown, Massachusetts. Her funeral mass was held on October 15, at St. Anthony Shrine in Boston, and was followed by a reception and private burial.

== Written works ==
- Kennedy, Joan Bennett (1992). The Joy of Classical Music: A Guide for You and Your Family. Nan A. Talese/Doubleday, New York. ISBN 978-0-385-41262-9.
