= Patrick J. Kennedy =

American politician (born 1967)

Patrick Kennedy
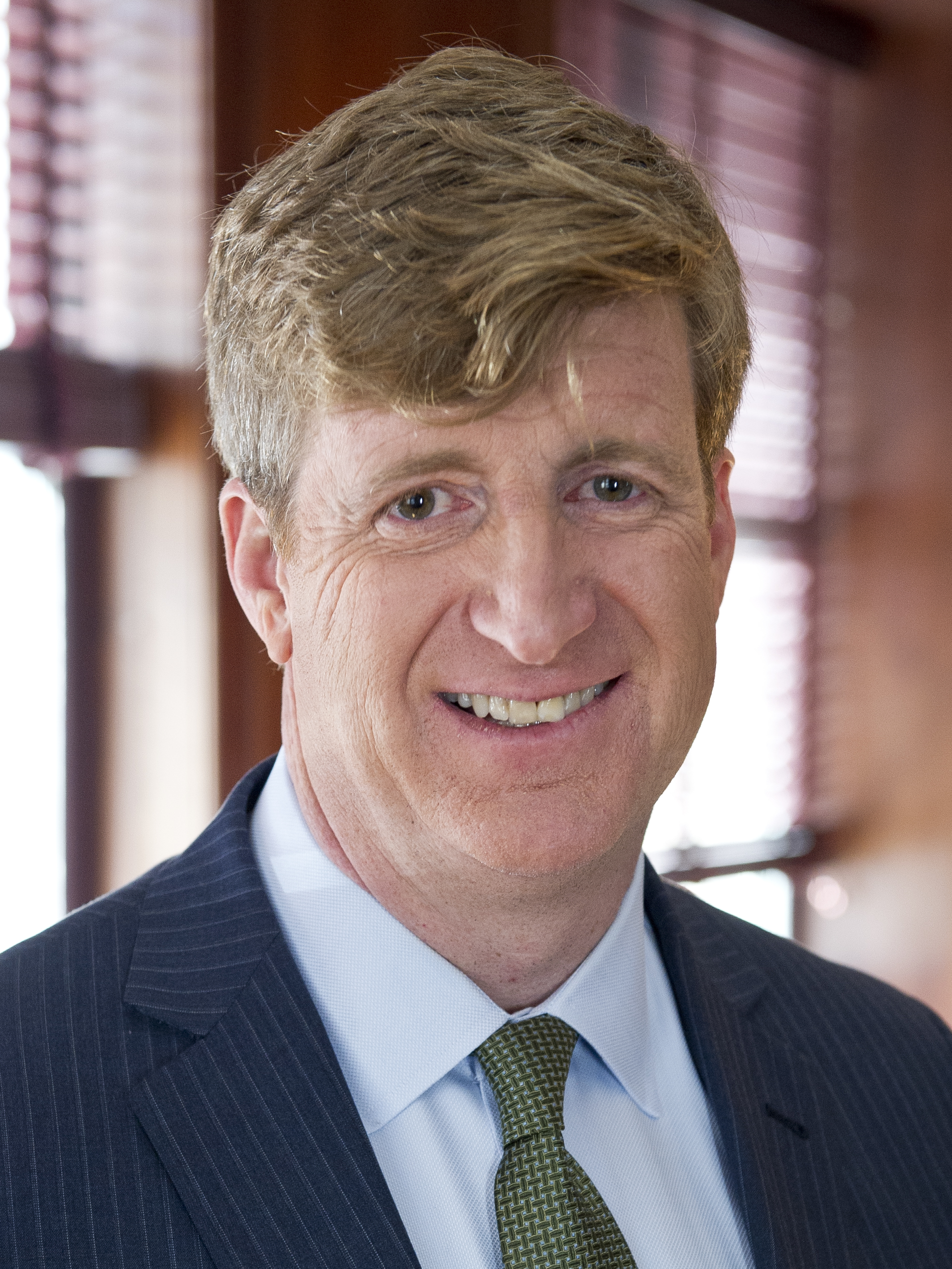
- Kennedy in 2016

Chair of the Democratic Congressional Campaign Committee
- In office January 3, 1999 – January 3, 2001
- Leader: Dick Gephardt
- Preceded by: Martin Frost
- Succeeded by: Nita Lowey

Member of the U.S. House of Representatives from Rhode Island's 1st district
- In office January 3, 1995 – January 3, 2011
- Preceded by: Ronald Machtley
- Succeeded by: David Cicilline

Member of the Rhode Island House of Representatives from the 9th district
- In office January 1, 1989 – January 1, 1993
- Preceded by: John Skeffington
- Succeeded by: Anastasia P. Williams

Personal details
- Born: Patrick Joseph Kennedy II; July 14, 1967 (age 59) Boston, Massachusetts, U.S.
- Party: Democratic
- Spouse: Amy Savell (m. 2011)
- Children: 5
- Parent(s): Ted Kennedy; Joan Bennett
- Relatives: See Kennedy family
- Education: Providence College (BS)
- Website: Official website

Patrick Joseph Kennedy II (born July 14, 1967) is an American retired politician and mental health advocate. From 1995 to 2011, he served as a Democratic member of the United States House of Representatives from Rhode Island's 1st congressional district, and was one of the first two Generation X members of Congress (with Randy Tate) when he took office in 1995.

Kennedy is the second son of Massachusetts Senator Ted Kennedy, and is a nephew of former U.S. President John F. Kennedy and former U.S. Senator Robert F. Kennedy. He graduated from Phillips Academy in Andover, Massachusetts, and graduated with a Bachelor of Science degree from Providence College. Kennedy was elected to the Rhode Island House of Representatives in 1989, becoming the youngest member of the Kennedy family to hold elected office. He was then elected to represent Rhode Island's 1st congressional district in the U.S. House of Representatives. He was repeatedly re-elected, serving from January 3, 1995, to January 3, 2011 (the 104th to 111th Congresses). In the House, Kennedy served on the Armed Services and Natural Resources Committees before being appointed to the Appropriations Committee. In 2017, he was appointed by President Donald Trump to serve as a member of the Opioid and Drug Abuse Commission. He is a co-founder of One Mind, a mental health nonprofit.

At the time of his father's death in late August 2009, Patrick was the last remaining member of the Kennedy family to serve in an elective office in Washington. After he chose not to seek re-election in 2010 and left office the following year, it was the first time that no member of the Kennedy family held elected office since 1947. The Kennedys' absence in politics was temporary, however, and following the next mid-term election, his first cousin once removed Joe Kennedy III would be sworn in to Congress and his cousin Caroline Kennedy would be appointed to an ambassadorship.

== Early life and education ==
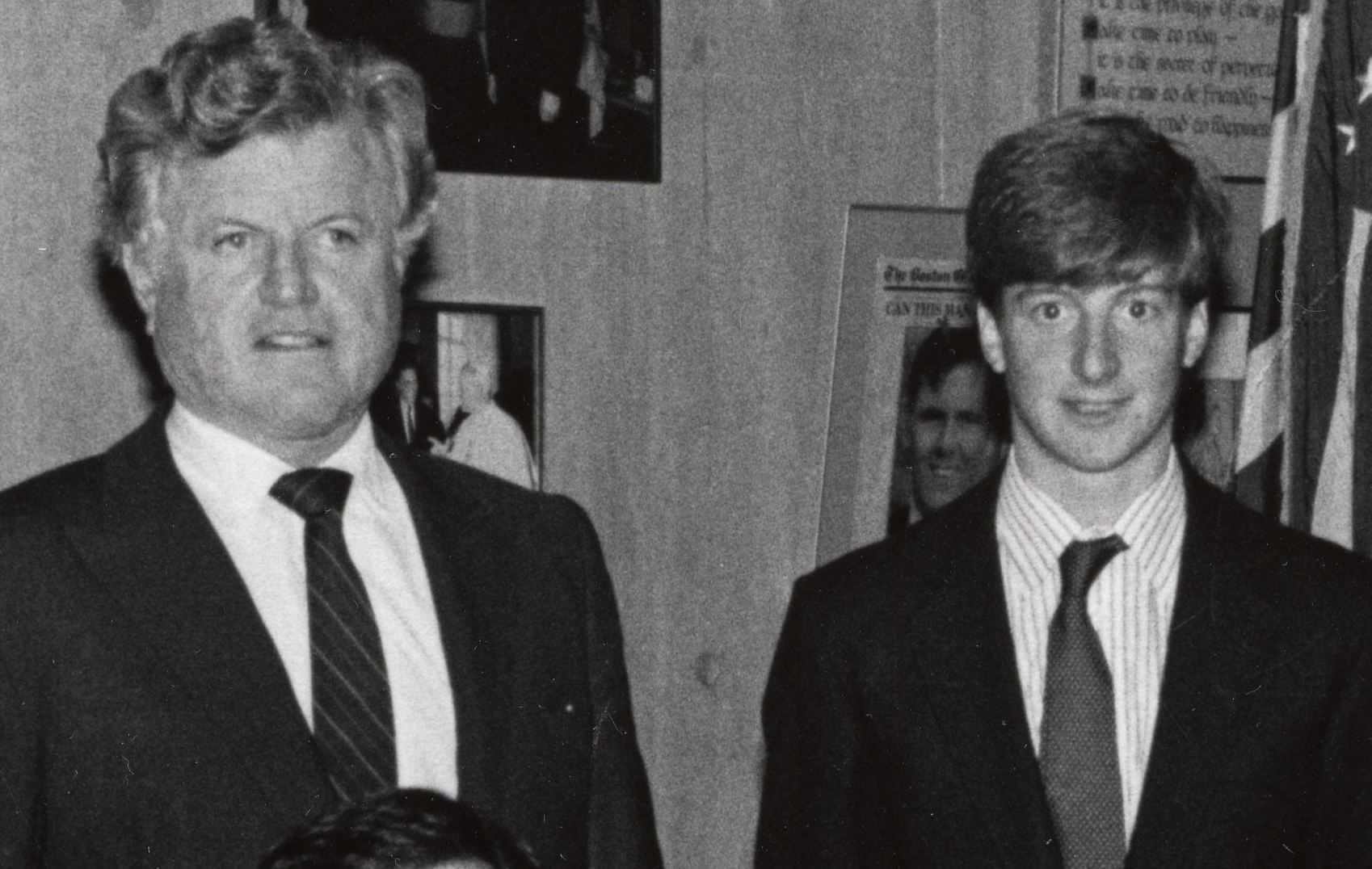
Patrick Kennedy with his father Ted Kennedy in 1985

Patrick Joseph Kennedy II was born in the Brighton section of Boston, Massachusetts. He is the youngest of three children born to Senator Edward Moore "Ted" Kennedy and musician/former model Virginia Joan Kennedy, (née) Bennett. He is also a nephew of President John F. Kennedy and Senator Robert F. Kennedy, and the youngest grandson of Joseph Patrick Kennedy Sr. and Rose Elizabeth Kennedy, (née) Fitzgerald. His sister Kara was a television and film producer, while his brother, Ted, Jr., is a lawyer and former member of the Connecticut State Senate. Patrick was named after his paternal great-grandfather, businessman and politician Patrick Joseph Kennedy.

Kennedy graduated in 1986 from Phillips Academy in Andover, Massachusetts. He received a Bachelor of Science degree from Providence College in 1991.

== Rhode Island House of Representatives ==
While a junior at Providence College, Kennedy defeated five-term incumbent John F. Skeffington, Jr., for the Democratic nomination in District 9. In 1988, Kennedy became the youngest member of the Kennedy family to hold elected office, when he won election to the Rhode Island House of Representatives at age 21. He served two terms in the House representing District 9 in Providence. He chose not to run for a third term and was succeeded by Anastasia P. Williams.

== U.S. House of Representatives ==
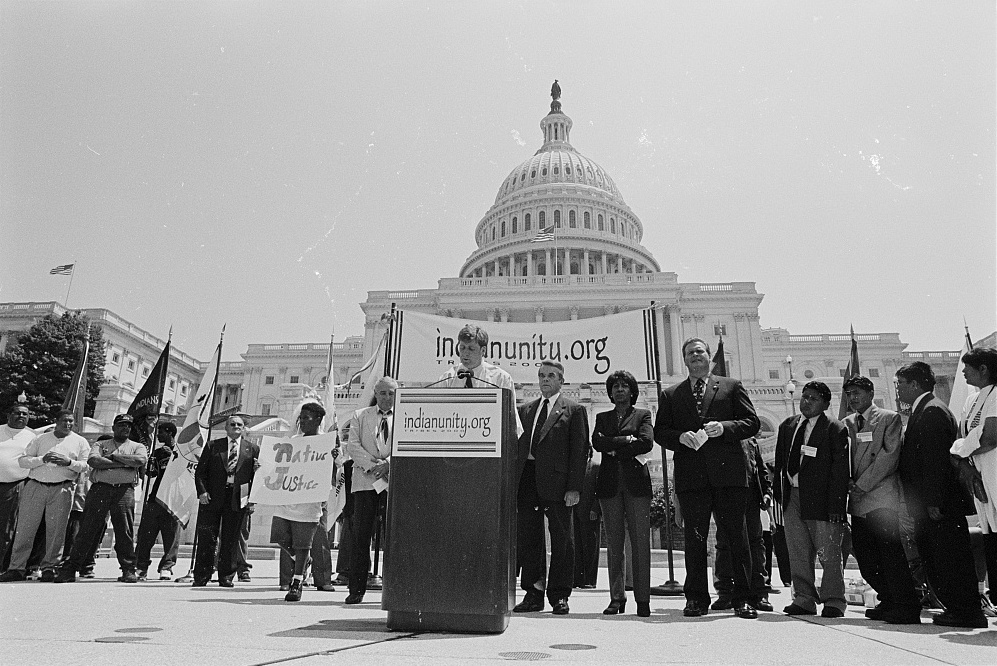
Kennedy speaking at a rally for American Indian and tribal unity in front of the U.S. Capitol

In 1994, Kennedy was elected as a Democrat to represent Rhode Island's 1st congressional district in the U.S. House of Representatives. He was re-elected seven times, serving from January 3, 1995, to January 3, 2011 (the 104th to 111th Congresses).

Kennedy was lead sponsor of the Mental Health Parity and Addiction Equity Act, which passed on October 3, 2008.

Kennedy authored and co-sponsored the Positive Aging Act, the Foundations for Learning Act, which established a grant program to improve mental and emotional health for school children through screening and early intervention, the National Neurotechnology Initiative Act, Genomics and Personalized Medicine Act; the COMBAT PTSD Act; the Nurse-Family Partnership Act, the Alzheimer's Treatment and Caregiver Support Act, and the Ready, Willing, and Able Act.

Kennedy was among the founders of the Congressional Down Syndrome Caucus and the 21st Century Healthcare Caucus and served as vice chairman of the Native American Caucus. He also joined the Congressional Boating Caucus; the Caucus on Armenian Issues; the Caucus on Hellenic Issues; the Fire Services Caucus; the Human Rights Caucus; the Travel and Tourism Caucus; the National Guard and Reserve Components Caucus; the Portuguese American Caucus (co-chair); and the Older American Caucus. He was a founder of the Rhode Island Chapter of the National Committee for Prevention of Child Abuse and chaired the Democratic Congressional Campaign Committee for two years (1999-2001). During his tenure as DCCC chairman, Kennedy became a headliner at Democratic political events and fundraisers around the country.

=== Committee assignments ===
- Committee on Appropriations
  - Subcommittee on Commerce, Justice, Science, and Related Agencies
  - Subcommittee on Labor, Health and Human Services, Education, and Related Agencies
  - Subcommittee on Military Construction, Veterans Affairs, and Related Agencies
  - Subcommittee on Labor, Health and Human Services, Education, and Related Agencies

== Political campaigns ==
Kennedy campaigned for the seat being vacated by U.S. Representative Ronald Machtley (who was retiring) in the 1994 Rhode Island 1st congressional district election. He won the election, defeating Republican candidate Kevin Vigilante. Kennedy was one of four Democrats in the 1994 congressional elections to win a congressional seat that had previously been held by a Republican, while Republicans gained dozens of seats to take over the U.S. House. He was re-elected every two years from 1996 until 2008 and did not run for re-election in 2010.

In 2000, Kennedy considered running against Republican Lincoln Chafee in the U.S. Senate election in Rhode Island, but instead chose to run for re-election. Kennedy had recently won appointment to the House Appropriations Committee, a high-profile assignment that caused him to pass up the Senate race. He again considered running against Chafee in 2006, but instead chose to run for re-election.

Kennedy did not run for re-election in 2010 and completed his final term in January 2011. He finished his 8th term at the completion of the 111th United States Congress.

== Post-congress advocacy ==
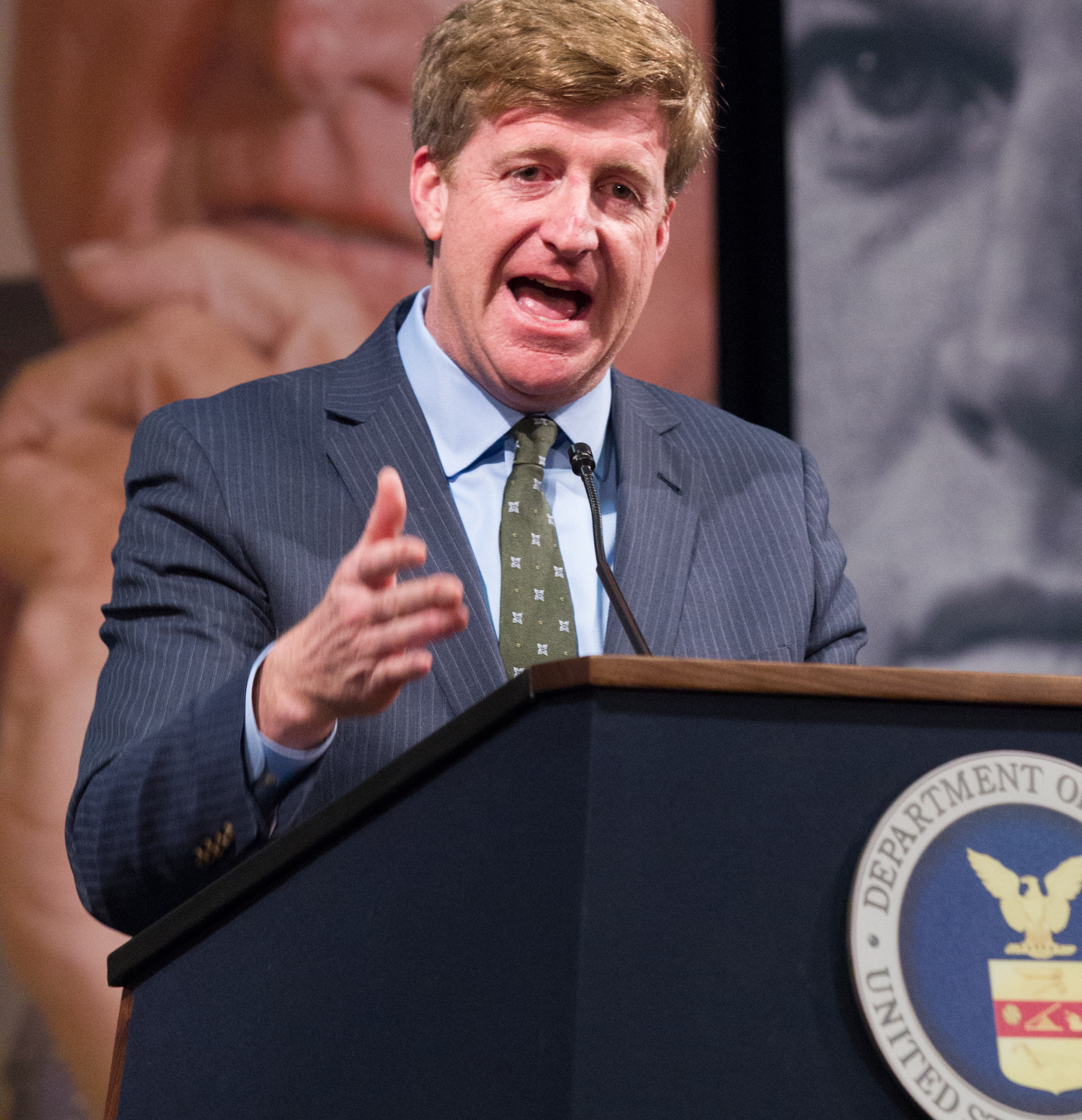
Kennedy in 2015

Since leaving Congress, Kennedy has written and spoken publicly about his long struggle with bipolar disorder and drug addiction and become a leading advocate for a stronger mental health care system in the United States.

Partnering with Shari and Garen Staglin in 2011, Kennedy launched One Mind (formerly One Mind for Research) with the intention of promoting the study of brain diseases. One Mind supports better diagnostics and new therapies to advance neuroscience discovery and fills the gaps in research funding by disseminating donor-supported funds.

Kennedy founded The Kennedy Forum in 2013, a behavioral health nonprofit, of which he is CEO, with the mission of leading the national dialogue on transforming mental health and addiction care delivery by uniting mental health advocates, business leaders, and government agencies around a common set of principles, including full implementation of the Federal Parity Law. In 2018, Politico termed Kennedy "the unlikely go-to player for companies seeking to benefit from the Trump administration’s multibillion-dollar response to the opioid crisis". Kennedy sits on the boards of eight corporations involved with the government's response to the drug crisis. He "holds an equity stake in the firms" and "collects director fees" from the latter organizations, many of which "stand to benefit from fresh efforts in Congress and the Trump administration to combat the opioid crisis". As such, Kennedy lobbied "former congressional colleagues to advocate for higher levels of spending".

In 2015, he co-authored A Common Struggle: A Personal Journey Through the Past and Future of Mental Illness and Addiction detailing his journey through mental illness, addiction, and his ongoing political advocacy for federal legislation in support of mental health and addiction health care.

In 2016, Kennedy founded Advocates for Opioid Recovery together with former House Speaker Newt Gingrich and Van Jones, a former domestic policy adviser to President Barack Obama.

He is also co-founder of Smart Approaches to Marijuana, established in 2013 with Kevin Sabet and David Frum, an anti-legalization group. Speaking in the context of California's Proposition 64, Kennedy argued the legalization movement was "putting our children at risk" and "exposed children from communities of color to more racial discrimination than before."

== Political positions ==
=== Healthcare ===
Kennedy is a vocal advocate for health care reform. During his tenure in Congress, he joined with U.S. Senator Pete Domenici (R–NM) in introducing legislation that places mental illness under the umbrella of health insurance.

He was a chief sponsor of one of the major pieces of legislation of 2008, the Mental Health Parity Act, a bill requiring most group health plans to provide coverage for the treatment of mental illnesses which is no less restrictive than coverage provided for physical illnesses.

He was a strong proponent of adding a comprehensive prescription-drug benefit to the U.S. Medicare and consistently opposed attempts to privatize the Medicare program. Kennedy also made numerous speeches advocating the re-orientation of the U.S. health-care system to preventive care. He has received numerous awards for his health care advocacy, including the Lymphoma Research Foundation's Paul E. Tsongas Memorial Award as well as the Leukemia & Lymphoma Society Congressional Honors Award. He also received the Society for Neuroscience — Public Service Award (2002), Eli Lilly and Company 2003 Helping Move Lives Forward Reintegration Award, American Psychoanalytic Association 2003 President's Award, American Psychiatric Association Alliance award (2003), and the Depression and Bipolar Support Alliance — Paul Wellstone Mental Health Award (2003).

He has also been awarded the National Recovery Champion Award, the American Foundation for Suicide Prevention Humanitarian Award, the American Psychiatric Association Patient Advocacy Award, the New York Academy of Science Breaking the Chains of Stigma Award, the Society for Neuroscience Public Service Award, the American College of Neuropsychopharmacology Distinguished Service Award, the Clifford Beers Foundation Centennial Award, the Autism Society of America Congressional Leadership Award, the Epilepsy Foundation Public Service Award, and the NAMI Humanitarian of the Year Award.

In a March 7, 2008, speech to the Cleveland City Club, Kennedy acknowledged having bipolar disorder and being a recovering alcoholic. He and his siblings have legal custody of their mother, who has long struggled with alcoholism.

Kennedy served on the Office of National Drug Control Policy's President's Commission on Combating Drug Addiction and the Opioid Crisis in 2017.

=== Iraq War ===
Kennedy was on the opposite side of the Iraq War debate as his father. He joined with 80 House Democrats in voting for the Authorization for Use of Military Force Against Iraq Resolution of 2002 (the minority view among House Democrats), whereas his father in the Senate joined anti-war Democrats in voting against the bill, which was a minority position among Senate Democrats.

=== 2008 presidential election ===
On January 28, 2008, Kennedy joined his father in endorsing Barack Obama in the 2008 U.S. presidential election, stating that Obama was the "perfect antidote to George Bush". Prior to that, Kennedy had joined his first cousin Timothy Shriver in endorsing U.S. Senator Christopher Dodd from Connecticut.

== Personal issues and incidents ==
=== Use of alcohol and other drugs ===
Kennedy acknowledged having a drug habit as a teenager and was treated at a rehabilitation center in 1986 and received counseling. He sought treatment for an OxyContin addiction in 2006. Due to his experience with addiction, Kennedy advocates against the legalization of recreational marijuana, but supports it for medical use.

=== Capitol Hill intoxicated-driving accident ===
On May 4, 2006, Kennedy crashed his automobile into a barricade on Capitol Hill in Washington, D.C., at 2:45 a.m. A United States Capitol Police official said the congressman had appeared intoxicated when he crashed his car. According to Kennedy, he was disoriented from the prescription medications Ambien and Phenergan. Anonymous sources are alleged to have seen Kennedy drinking at the nearby Hawk & Dove bar prior to the accident. Kennedy also stated to officers that he was "late for a vote". However, the last vote of the night had occurred almost six hours earlier. The standard field sobriety test was not administered, and Kennedy was driven home by an officer.

The next day, Kennedy admitted publicly that he had an addiction to prescription medication and announced he would be readmitting himself to a drug-rehabilitation facility at the Mayo Clinic in Minnesota where he had sought treatment for prior addictions. He has stated that he has no recollection of the car crash. A few days later, Kennedy received a show of support when he was endorsed by the Rhode Island Democratic Party. A month after the incident, Kennedy was released from drug rehabilitation.

On June 13, 2006, Kennedy made a deal with prosecutors and pleaded guilty to a charge of driving under the influence of prescription drugs. He was sentenced to one-year probation and a fine of $350. Two of the three charges (reckless driving and failure to exhibit a driving permit) were dismissed. He was also ordered to attend a rehabilitation program that includes weekly urine tests, twice-weekly meetings with a probation officer, near-daily Alcoholics Anonymous meetings and a weekly meeting of recovering addicts.

On June 12, 2009, Kennedy announced that he had again entered rehab, for an indefinite time at an undisclosed facility. In a statement to the press, Kennedy said that his recovery is a "life-long process" and that he would do whatever it takes to preserve his health: "I have decided to temporarily step away from my normal routine to ensure that I am being as vigilant as possible in my recovery", Kennedy said.

In 2018, Kennedy said that he had been sober for more than six years.

== Personal life and family ==
His father, Massachusetts Senator Ted Kennedy, died on August 25, 2009. Patrick made a tearful eulogy at the funeral, saying that, "He [Ted] would be very proud to see you all out here today paying a final respect and tribute to his memory". He further elaborated on his experiences with his father as a child, saying his father would stay at his bedside during his frequent bouts of ill health.

Kennedy decided not to run for re-election in 2010, saying his life "has taken a new direction". Mark Weiner, a major Democratic party fund-raiser in Rhode Island and one of Kennedy's top financial backers, said: "It's tough to get up and go to work every day when your partner is not there. I think he just had a broken heart after his father passed away."

As of 2014, Kennedy resides in Brigantine, New Jersey. In March 2011, he announced his engagement to eighth-grade history teacher Amy Savell. The couple married on July 15, 2011, in Hyannis Port, Massachusetts. They have three sons and two daughters.

In January 2020, Amy Kennedy announced her candidacy for the Democratic nomination for United States Congress, to represent New Jersey's 2nd congressional district. Amy Kennedy defeated Brigid Callahan Harrison in the Democratic primary in July, and faced Democrat-turned-Republican incumbent Jeff Van Drew in the November general election. She was ultimately defeated by Van Drew, receiving 46.2% of the vote.

== Honors ==
- Grand-Officer of the Order of Prince Henry, Portugal (June 8, 1996)

== See also ==
- Kennedy family
- Kennedy curse

U.S. House of Representatives
Preceded by Ronald Machtley	Member of the U.S. House of Representatives from Rhode Island's 1st congressional district 1995–2011	Succeeded by David Cicilline
Honorary titles
Preceded by Cleo Fields	Baby of the House; 1995–1997	Succeeded by Harold Ford Jr.
Party political offices
Preceded by Martin Frost	Chair of the Democratic Congressional Campaign Committee; 1999–2001	Succeeded by Nita Lowey
U.S. order of precedence (ceremonial)
Preceded by Charles Taylor as Former U.S. Representative	Order of precedence of the United States as Former U.S. Representative	Succeeded by John Yarmuth as Former U.S. Representative
