= Edward M. Kennedy Jr. =

American lawyer and politician (born 1961)

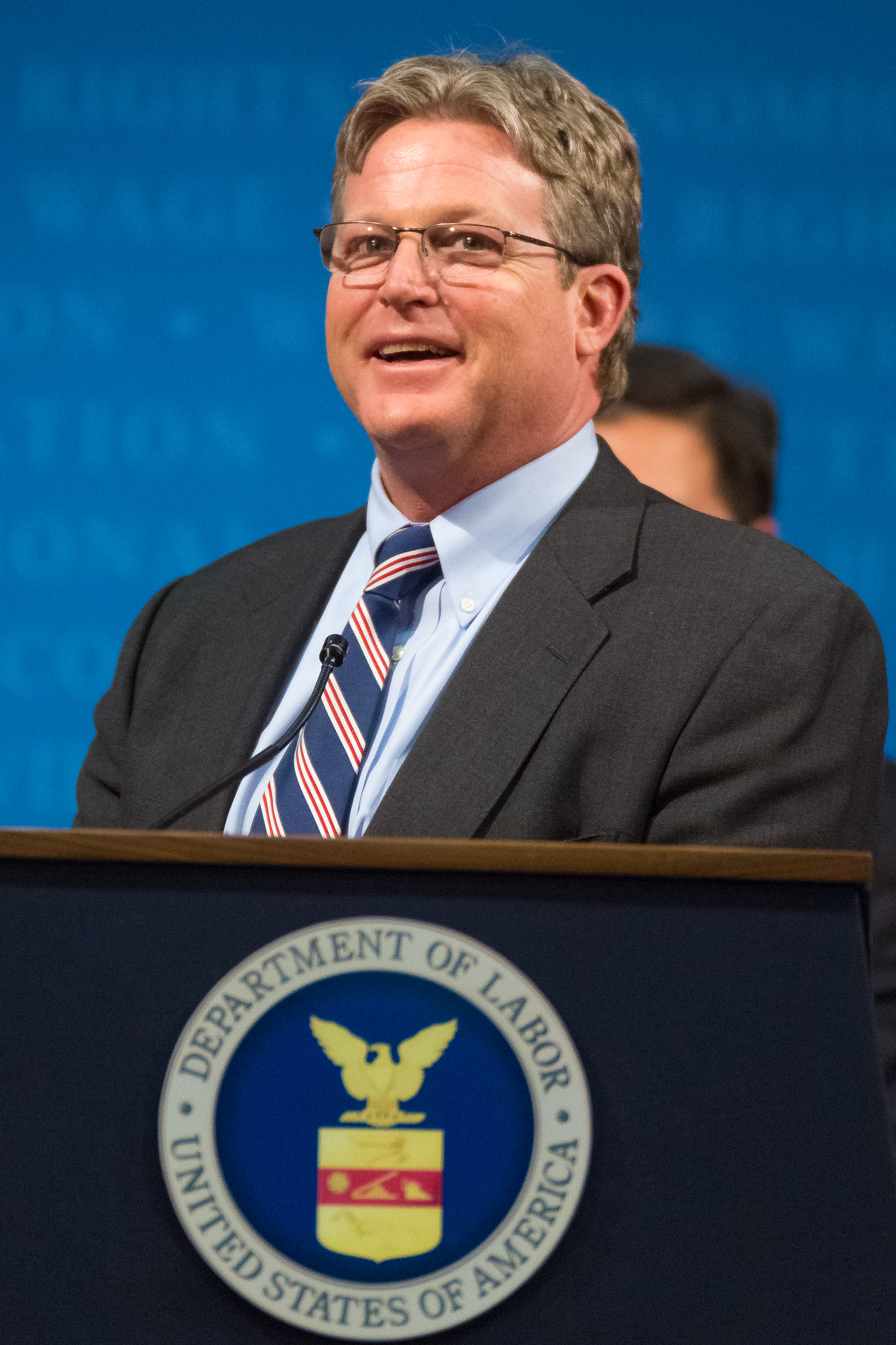
- Kennedy in 2015

Member of the Connecticut Senate from the 12th district
- In office January 7, 2015 – January 9, 2019
- Preceded by: J. Edward Meyer
- Succeeded by: Christine Cohen

Personal details
- Born: Edward Moore Kennedy Jr. September 26, 1961 (age 65) Boston, Massachusetts, U.S.
- Party: Democratic
- Spouse: Kiki Gershman (m. 1993)
- Children: 2
- Parents: Ted Kennedy; Joan Bennett Kennedy
- Relatives: Kennedy family
- Education: Wesleyan University (BA); Yale University (MS); University of Connecticut, Hartford (JD)

Edward Moore Kennedy Jr. (born September 26, 1961) is an American lawyer and politician. He is a partner at Epstein Becker & Green, a firm headquartered in New York City, and previously represented Connecticut's 12th State Senate district in the Connecticut State Senate from 2015 to 2019. He is a son of United States Senate member Ted Kennedy from Massachusetts and a nephew of President John F. Kennedy and Senator Robert F. Kennedy.

== Early life and education ==
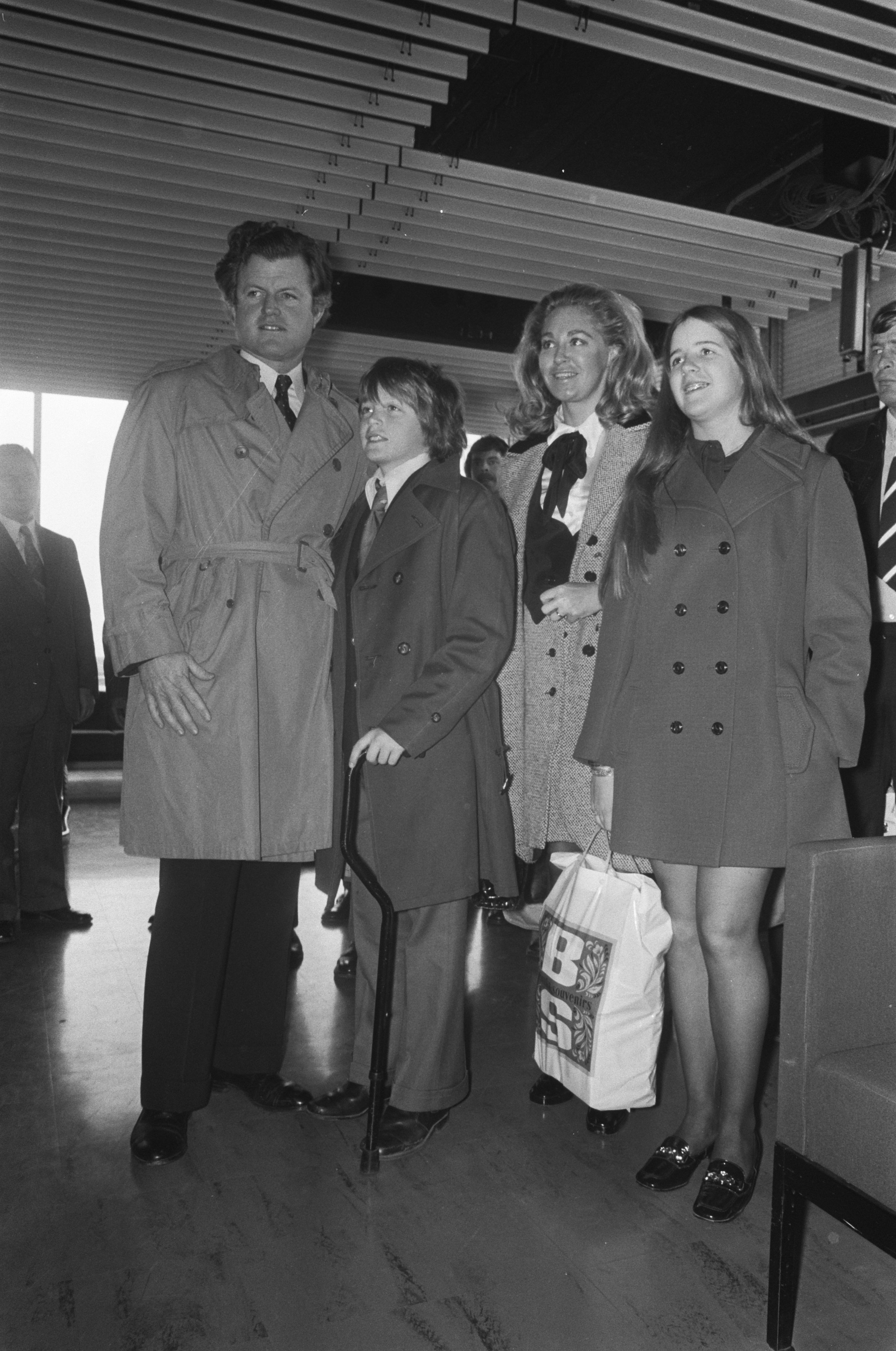
Kennedy with his parents and sister Kara in Amsterdam, 1974. He is holding a cane.

Kennedy was born in the Brighton section of Boston, Massachusetts to U.S. Senator Ted Kennedy and Joan Bennett Kennedy during the presidency of his paternal uncle, John. He is the brother of Kara (1960–2011) and Patrick J. Kennedy (born 1967).

In 1973, when Kennedy was about to turn twelve, osteosarcoma (a form of bone cancer) was diagnosed in his right leg. After rounds of chemotherapy failed to kill the cancer, the leg was surgically amputated on November 17, 1973. On that same day, his father had escorted his niece Kathleen down the aisle at her wedding and rushed back to the hospital. A made-for-TV movie, The Ted Kennedy Jr. Story (1986), concentrated on this event in young Kennedy's life.

In 1982, his mother, Joan, revealed that Kennedy missed being aboard Air Florida Flight 90 by just ten minutes, which crashed into the Potomac River on January 13 of that year, killing 74 people. Kennedy was delayed on the drive to the airport and missed the flight.

Kennedy graduated from the private St. Albans School, in Washington, D.C. After completing a Bachelor of Arts degree at Wesleyan University in 1984, he continued his studies at Yale University, earning a master's degree from the School of Forestry and Environmental Studies. He then attended the University of Connecticut School of Law at night, earning a Juris Doctor degree. On May 19, 2013, Kennedy received an honorary Doctor of Laws degree from the University of New Haven.

== Career ==
After graduation he worked at the New Haven law firm Wiggin & Dana specializing in disability issues. He later co-founded and served as president of the Marwood Group, a firm that advises corporations about health care and financial services. He left the Marwood Group in 2014 to join the law firm of Epstein Becker & Green where he advises health care providers, commercial insurers, and life science companies on critical issues related to health care reform policies.

Kennedy is the Chairman of the board of directors of the American Association of People with Disabilities.

== Political career ==
On April 8, 2014, Kennedy announced his candidacy for a seat in the Connecticut State Senate representing the state's 12th district. He was elected on November 4. He was re-elected on November 8, 2016. In both election cycles, Kennedy defeated Bruce Wilson Jr.

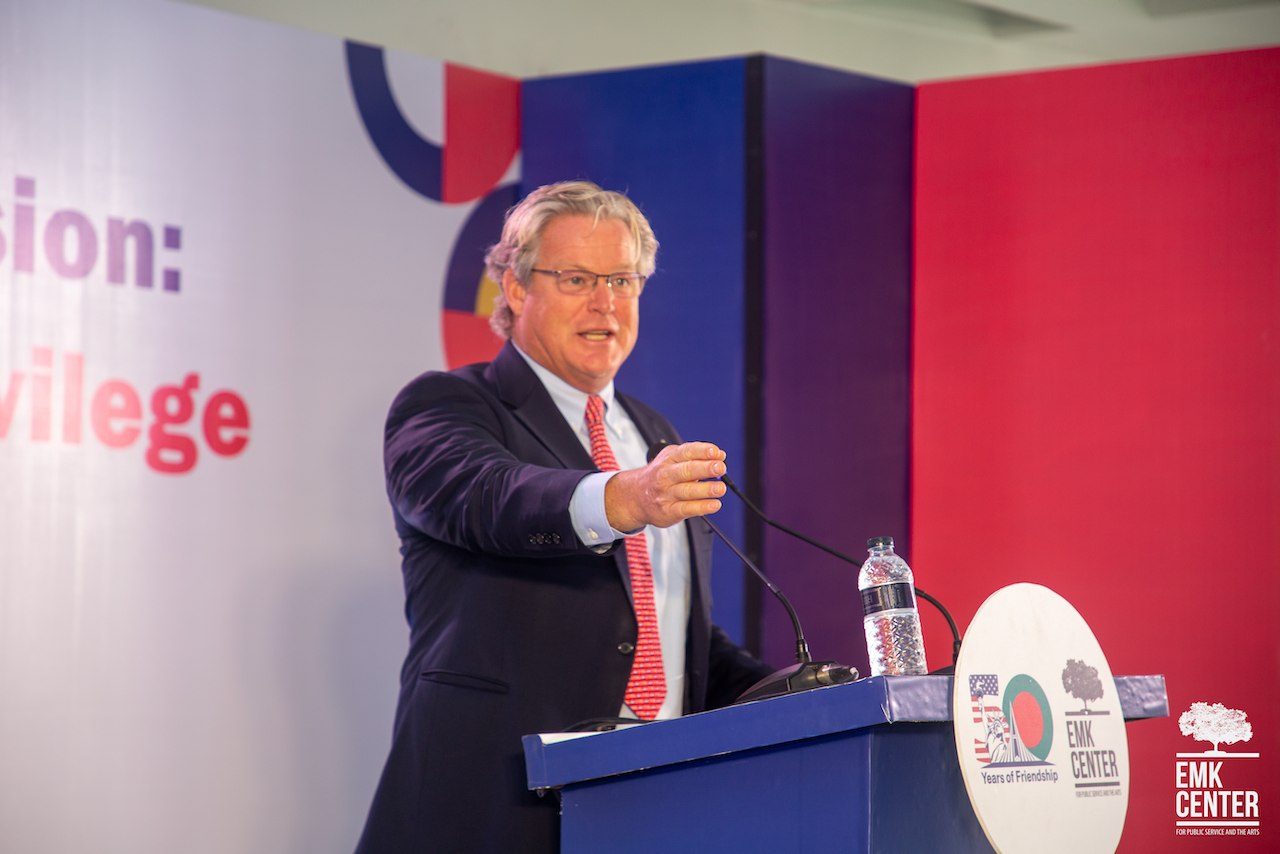
Kennedy Jr. speaking at an event in Bangladesh

On June 26, 2017, Kennedy announced that he would not run for Governor of Connecticut in 2018. On February 28, 2018, Kennedy announced he would not seek re-election to the State Senate. On November 6, 2018, Democrat Christine Cohen won the general election to replace Kennedy after defeating Republican Adam Greenberg. She was sworn in on January 9, 2019.

=== State Senate ===
Kennedy was first sworn in to serve in the Connecticut State Senate on January 7, 2015.

Committee assignments

- Committee on the Environment (Senate Co-chair)
- Committee on Internship (Ranking Member)
- Committee on Public Health
- Committee on Transportation

Party leadership

- Deputy Majority Leader

== Personal life ==
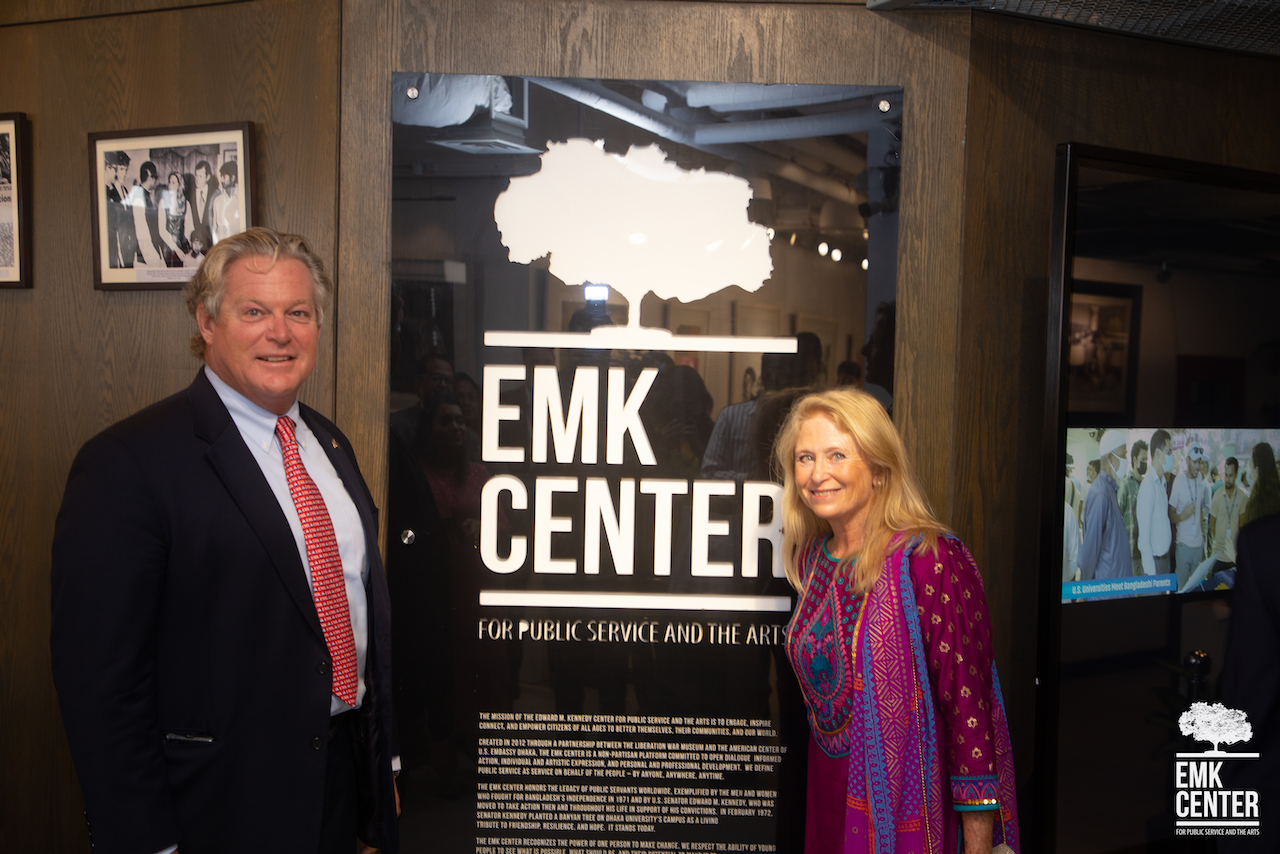
With Kiki during a trip to Bangladesh (2022)

On October 10, 1993, Kennedy married Katherine Anne "Kiki" Gershman (born 1959) on Block Island, Rhode Island. She is an assistant clinical professor of psychiatry at the Yale School of Medicine and an environmental advocate. She serves as spokeswoman for Stop the Pipeline, which successfully blocked the Islander East natural gas pipeline across the Long Island Sound. They live in Branford, Connecticut.

The couple have a daughter, Kiley Elizabeth Kennedy (born August 7, 1994, in New Haven), a competitive snowboarder who graduated from Wesleyan University in 2016, and a son, Edward Moore Kennedy III (born February 26, 1998, in New Haven), who graduated from Choate Rosemary Hall in 2016 and from Wesleyan University in 2020.

Kennedy gave a tribute at his father's public funeral on August 29, 2009.

== See also ==
- Kennedy family
- Kennedy curse
