= Advocates for Opioid Recovery =

Advocacy group for medication-assisted opioid treatment

Advocates for Opioid Recovery (AOR) is an advocacy group founded in 2016 by former Rep. Patrick J. Kennedy, former House Speaker Newt Gingrich, and Van Jones, a former domestic policy adviser to former United States President Barack Obama.

The group's mission is to change regulatory barriers that restrict patient access to recovery medications, and increase public support and funding for opioid recovery programs. They aim to provide access to science-based, evidence-based treatment and support systems to reduce death and suffering from opioid addiction, and help more addiction survivors stay addiction-free long-term and integrate back into their communities.

== Activities ==
The group's activities have included publishing op-eds and providing interviews to push for opioid addiction treatment.

As paid advisers for the group, Kennedy, Gingrich and Van Jones have conducted a number of joint interviews with various media outlets, ranging from Fox News to the New Yorker.

The group's social media campaign "#LetsTrumpAddiction" is aimed at encouraging President Trump to reaffirm his commitment to ending the opioid crisis.

== Positions ==
Gingrich, Kennedy and Jones have called for Congress to fix the national shortage of physicians who are certified to prescribe opioid recovery medication, as well as the laws that restrict the number of addicted patients a physician can treat in a year. They have called for insurance companies to start covering treatments with medication in the same manner as they cover treatments for any other chronic disease. Additionally, they have called for drug courts to encourage treatment with medication as part of sentencing.

== Funding ==
According to STAT News, Gingrich stated he had no idea who was funding the organization. According to USA Today, the organization is funded by a grant from Braeburn Pharmaceuticals.
