= Prosecuting Attorney of Honolulu =

Elected prosecutor position in Honolulu

Seal of the City & County of Honolulu

The Prosecuting Attorney of Honolulu is one of only two countywide elected positions in the City & County of Honolulu in the State of Hawai'i. The officeholder is responsible for the prosecution of people for offenses to the laws and regulations established by the municipal government. Under the guidance of the Attorney General of Hawai'i, the Prosecuting Attorney of Honolulu also has the power to prosecute on behalf of the citizens of the state.

== Elected prosecutors ==
- Charles F. Marsland (1981–1988)
- Keith M. Kaneshiro (1989–1996)
- Peter B. Carlisle (1997–2010)
- Keith M. Kaneshiro (2010–2020)
- Steven S. Alm (2021-present)
