= Kara Kennedy =

American filmmaker and television news producer

- Kennedy in 2009
- Born: Kara Anne Kennedy; February 27, 1960; Bronxville, New York, U.S.
- Died: September 16, 2011 (aged 51); Washington, D.C., U.S.
- Other name: Kara Kennedy Allen
- Education: Trinity College; Tufts University (BA)
- Occupations: Homemaker, professional board of directors member, television producer
- Spouse: Michael Allen (divorced)
- Children: 2
- Parent(s): Ted Kennedy; Joan Bennett Kennedy
- Family: Kennedy

Kara Anne Kennedy (February 27, 1960 – September 16, 2011) was a member of the Kennedy family. She was the oldest of the three children of U.S. Senator Ted Kennedy and Joan Bennett Kennedy and was their only daughter. Kennedy was also a niece of President John F. Kennedy and Senator Robert F. Kennedy. Kennedy served on the boards of numerous charities and was a filmmaker and television producer. A cancer survivor, she died of a heart attack in 2011 at the age of 51.

== Early life and education ==
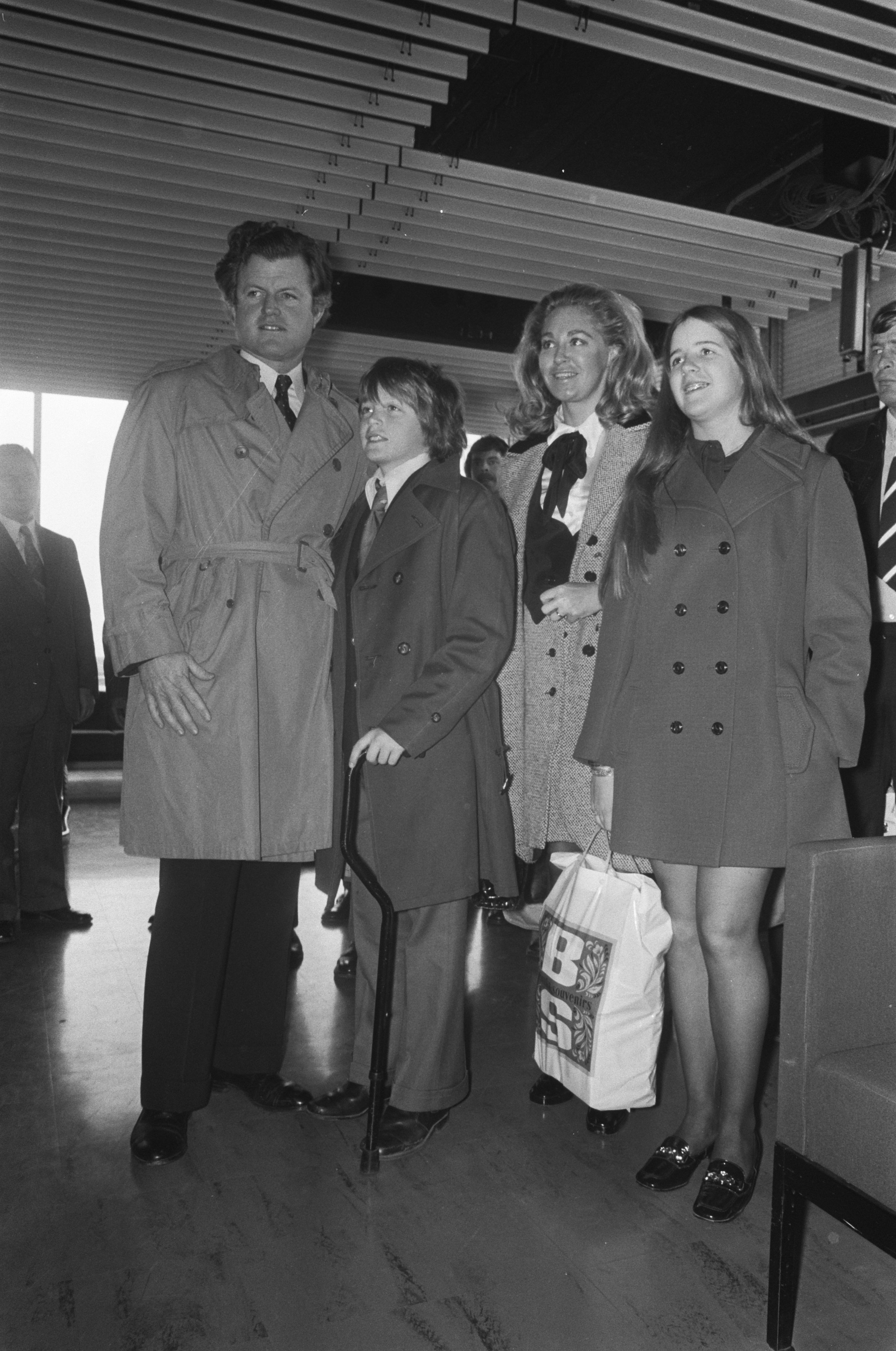
Kennedy with her parents and brother Ted Jr. in Amsterdam, 1974.

Kara Anne Kennedy was born in 1960 to Joan and Ted Kennedy in Bronxville, New York. In his book True Compass, Senator Kennedy wrote about his joy at her birth: "I had never seen a more beautiful baby nor been more happy." Her siblings were Edward Moore Kennedy, Jr. (born 1961), and Patrick Joseph Kennedy II (born 1967). She spent her early years in McLean, Virginia, and Cape Cod, Massachusetts. She attended the National Cathedral School in Washington, D.C., and Trinity College, Hartford. Kennedy graduated from Tufts University.

== Career ==
After graduating from the National Cathedral School in 1978, Kennedy worked on her father's 1980 presidential campaign before matriculating at Tufts University. Following the receipt of her degree in 1983, she pursued a career in television, working at Fox News in New York. She also was a producer for the television program Evening Magazine at station WBZ-TV in Boston.

Kennedy produced films for VSA arts, formerly known as Very Special Arts, an organization founded by her aunt Jean Kennedy Smith to encourage participation in the arts by persons with disabilities. One of Kennedy's best known projects was a film she produced on Chris Burke, an actor with Down syndrome who starred in the television series Life Goes On.

Kennedy served as a director emerita and a national trustee of the John F. Kennedy Library Foundation, a non-profit organization that provides financial support, staffing, and creative resources for the John F. Kennedy Presidential Library and Museum in Boston.

Kennedy served as a board member of the Edward M. Kennedy Institute for the United States Senate, where she co-produced a film about the Institute that was shown at its inaugural groundbreaking event. Kennedy also served on the National Advisory Board of the National Organization on Fetal Alcohol Syndrome (NOFAS).

== Personal life ==
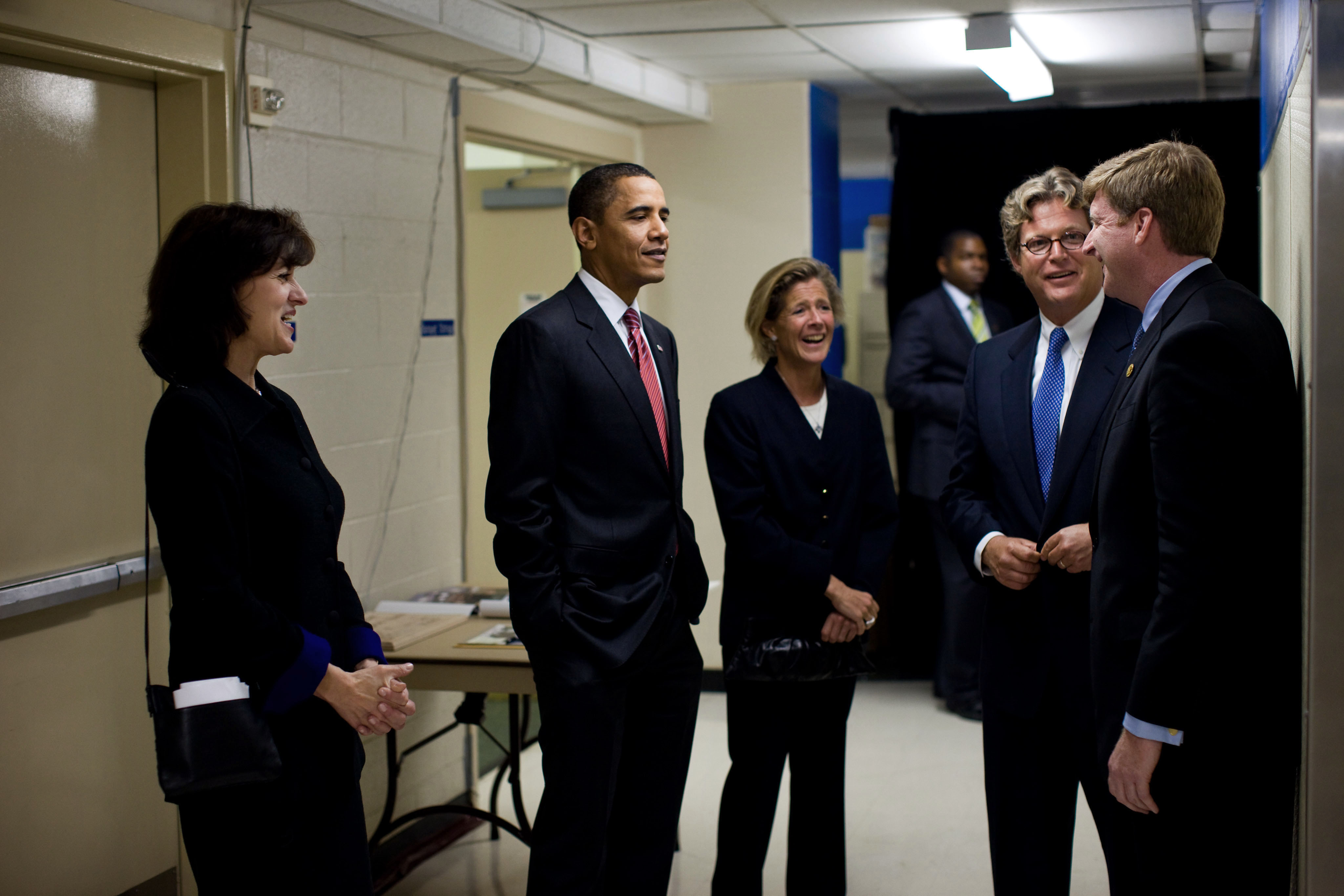
Kara Kennedy with stepmother Vicki Kennedy, Barack Obama and her brothers, 2009.

On September 9, 1990, Kennedy and Michael Allen, an architect and real estate developer from Rhode Island, were married at the Our Lady of Victory Church in Centerville, Massachusetts. When she married, Kennedy dropped her middle name "Anne" and replaced it with her maiden name "Kennedy" as her new middle name. Kennedy and Allen had two children: Grace Elizabeth Allen, also known as Grace Kennedy Allen (born 1994); and Max Greathouse Allen (born 1996). Kennedy's marriage to Allen ended in divorce.

In 2002, at age 42, Kennedy was diagnosed with lung cancer. A former smoker, Kennedy was initially told that the cancer was inoperable. Nevertheless, with her father's help, she found a surgeon at the Brigham and Women's Hospital in Boston who was willing to remove part of her right lung in an effort to save her life. The operation was successful, and Kennedy resumed an active life that included regular running and swimming.

On August 12, 2009, Kennedy accepted the Presidential Medal of Freedom from President Barack Obama on behalf of her father at a ceremony in Washington, D.C. Her father died 13 days later; he had been diagnosed with brain cancer in May 2008. In April 2011, Kennedy wrote an article for The Boston Globe Magazine about her family life growing up and her father's influence on her. Kennedy revealed her close relationship with her father and the role he played in helping her to wage her battle against lung cancer.

== Death ==
On September 16, 2011, two years after her father's death, Kennedy suffered a fatal heart attack in a Washington, D.C., health club after her daily workout. She was 51.
