= Smart Approaches to Marijuana =

American political organization

- Abbreviation: SAM
- Formation: January 1, 2013; 13 years ago
- Founders: Patrick Kennedy and Kevin Sabet
- Type: 501(c)(3) nonprofit
- Headquarters: Alexandria, Va. New York, NY
- Region served: US, International
- President and CEO: Kevin Sabet
- Executive Vice President: Luke Niforatos
- Vice President of Federal Affairs: Garth Van Meter
- Key people: David Frum, Barry McCaffrey
- Affiliations: SAM Action, a 501(c)(4)
- Budget: $2M
- Staff: 20+
- Volunteers: 100+
- Website: learnaboutsam.org

Smart Approaches to Marijuana (SAM, Inc.) is an American political organization opposed to marijuana legalization and commercialization.

== History and background ==
SAM was founded in 2013 by former U.S. Representative Patrick Kennedy and White House advisor Kevin Sabet.

== Funding ==
SAM says it is mostly funded by small donors, and by grants. Kevin Sabet said none of the organization's funding comes from corporations or opiate manufacturers.

== International branches ==
- Smart Approaches to Marijuana Canada (SAMC)
- Smart Approaches to Marijuana New Zealand (Say Nope to Dope)

== See also ==
- Arguments for and against drug prohibition
- Decriminalization of marijuana in the United States
