= Charles Marsland =

American prosecutor (1923–2007)

Prosecuting Attorney of Honolulu
- In office January 1, 1981 – December 31, 1988
- Succeeded by: Keith M. Kaneshiro

Personal details
- Born: Charles Francis Marsland; April 11, 1923 Honolulu, Hawaii
- Died: April 11, 2007 (aged 84) Honolulu, Hawaii
- Party: Hawaii Republican Party
- Spouse: Jayne Watts Marsland
- Domestic partner: Polly Grigg
- Children: 2
- Education: Tufts University; Northeastern University

Military service
- Allegiance: United States
- Branch/service: United States Navy
- Rank: Lieutenant
- Battles/wars: World War II

Charles Marsland (1923–2007) was a Honolulu attorney who served as the first elected Prosecuting Attorney of Honolulu from 1981 to 1988. He is best known for his aggressive prosecution of the Hawaiian Mob during the mid 1980s, which took place after the murder of his son that was allegedly connected to organized crime.

== Early life and education ==
Marsland, the grandson of Norwegian immigrants to Hawaii, was born on April 11, 1923. His father, Charles F. Marsland Sr., was a deep-sea diver and his mother Sadie was a schoolteacher. Marsland attended the prestigious Punahou School and, upon graduation, attended Tufts College in Medford, Massachusetts. While enrolled, he joined the US Navy Reserve Officers Training Corps as a rifleman and was subsequently deployed to fight in the Pacific Ocean theater of World War II. As a Naval commander, Marsland fought in the Philippines and, after the war, remained in the Navy as a prison administration officer at Pearl Harbor. Following his discharge from the Navy, he returned to Tufts and graduated with his bachelor's degree in 1949, then enrolled at Northeastern University's school of law in Boston.

== Career ==
=== Assistant attorney general in Massachusetts (1953 - 1958) ===
Marsland's first job as a prosecutor was working as an assistant attorney general in 1953, serving in the office of then-Massachusetts Attorney General George Fingold. As an assistant attorney general, he prosecuted cases involving gambling, organized crime, and murder.

=== Campaign for Plymouth County district attorney (1958) ===
In 1958, Marsland resigned from the attorney generals' office and entered private practice. He attempted to run for his first elected office as Plymouth County district attorney, challenging incumbent John Wheatley. However, he fell short in the Republican primary, losing with 8,463 votes to 13,569 votes. Wheatley went on to win re-election unopposed.

=== Deputy Corporation Counsel in Honolulu (1967 - 1979) ===
Marsland left Boston following his divorce and moved back to Honolulu in 1967. His first job in Hawaii was as a deputy corporation counsel, handling civil litigation for the city of Honolulu. His work involved compliance with civil rights law, pursuing civil actions on behalf of the city, and defending police officers accused of brutality. During this period of his career, he developed a good rapport with the Honolulu Police Department which he carried with him to his next job as county prosecutor.

=== Prosecuting Attorney in Honolulu (1980 - 1988) ===
After joining the prosecutors' office, Marsland briefly led a unit focused on the prosecution of career criminals. After being fired from the office, he ran for and won the inaugural 1980 election, becoming the first elected Prosecuting Attorney of Honolulu. After being elected, he was credited with doubling the size of the prosecutors' office and aggressively targeting organized crime.

== Personal life ==
Marsland married a television presenter named Jayne Watts in Boston in 1953. Together, they had two children - Charles F. Marsland Jr. (more commonly known as "Chuckers") (born in 1955) and Laurie Jane Marsland (born in 1957). In 1967, Marsland and his wife separated. Marsland gained sole custody of his son Chuckers and returned to Hawaii. Later, he formed a relationship with an interior designer named Polly Grigg, who remained his domestic partner until his death in 2007.

=== Death ===
Marsland died at his Portlock home on April 11, 2007. In his honor, his family trust donated $3 million to the Shriners Hospital for children in Honolulu. This amount was the largest donation to the Shriners in Honolulu from a single individual.
