= Jonathan Caulkins =

American drug policy researcher

Jonathan Paul Caulkins
- Born: 1965 (age 60–61)
- Education: Washington University in St. Louis, Massachusetts Institute of Technology
- Awards: INFORMS President's Award and Fellow, 2010
- Scientific career
- Fields: Drug policy, operations research
- Workplaces: Carnegie Mellon University's Heinz College
- Thesis: The Distribution and Consumption of Illicit Drugs: Some Mathematical Models and Their Policy Implications (1990)
- Doctoral advisor: Arnold I. Barnett

Jonathan Paul Caulkins (born 1965) is an American drug policy researcher and the H. Guyford Stever Professor of Operations Research and Public Policy at Heinz College at Carnegie Mellon University.

== Education ==
Caulkins received his B.S. and M.S. from Washington University in St. Louis in 1987, and his S.M. and Ph.D. from the Massachusetts Institute of Technology in 1989 and 1990, respectively.

== Career ==
Caulkins joined the faculty of Heinz College in 1990, and has remained there ever since, with the exceptions of leaves he took to serve as co-director of the RAND Corporation's Drug Policy Research Center in Santa Monica from 1994 to 1996, to found RAND's Pittsburgh office from 1999 to 2001, and to teach at the Doha campus of Carnegie Mellon from 2005 to 2011.

== Research ==
Caulkins has conducted research on illicit drugs and the policies surrounding them. In one study, he found that more than 85% of people in prison on drug charges were involved in drug distribution, and that most of the remaining prisoners had some suggestion of involvement in distribution. While at RAND, he also led another study that found that mandatory sentencing for low-level drug offenders was ineffective because, in Caulkins' words, "most incarcerated drug dealers can be easily replaced on the street." With respect to marijuana, he has said that, contrary to popular belief, most users of the drug are not college graduates, and that advocates of the drug's legalization tend to overstate its role in crime and violence with respect to drug trafficking from Mexico.

== Recognition ==
He won the Institute for Operations Research and the Management Sciences (INFORMS) President's Award in 2010, and became an INFORMS Fellow in the same year.

Caulkins was elected a member of the National Academy of Engineering in 2015 for contributions to the analysis, modeling, and engineering of drug policy in the United States and abroad.

== Book ==
- Mark Kleiman, Jonathan Caulkins and Angela Hawken, Drugs and Drug Policy: What Everyone Needs to Know, Oxford University Press, 2011 (ISBN 9780199764501).
