= Mark Kleiman =

American professor, author, and blogger (1951–2019)

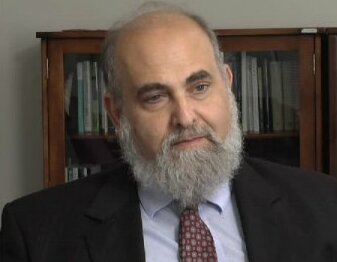
Mark Kleiman in April 2012

Mark Albert Robert Kleiman (May 18, 1951 – July 21, 2019) was an American professor, author, and blogger who dealt with issues of drug and criminal justice policy.

A professor of public policy for many years at UCLA, Kleiman in 2015 became the director of the Crime and Justice Program at New York University's Marron Institute of Urban Management. Kleiman was an expert in the field of crime and drug policy and authored several books in the field.

Kleiman advised local, state, national, and international governmental bodies on crime control and drug policy. He founded and directed BOTEC Analysis LLC, a consultancy that focuses on crime, drug policy, and urban development. BOTEC advised the State of Washington and the government of Canada as they sought to create legal adult-use cannabis markets.

== Early life ==
Born in Phoenix to a Jewish family, Kleiman grew up in Baltimore and attended the Baltimore public schools. He was a graduate of Haverford College and received a master's degree in public policy from the John F. Kennedy School of Government at Harvard University in 1977 and a Ph.D. in public policy, also from Harvard, in 1985.

== Academic career ==
Kleiman served for 18 years as a professor of public policy at the UCLA Luskin School of Public Affairs. He was also a visiting professor at Harvard Law School and the University of Virginia Batten School of Leadership and Public Policy (2012), and the first Thomas C. Schelling Visiting Professor at the University of Maryland School of Public Policy (2006-2007).

Kleiman was an emeritus professor at UCLA, a professor of public policy at New York University from 2015 until his death, and an adjunct scholar at the Center for American Progress. He was also a member of the Committee on Law and Justice of the United States National Research Council and editor of the Journal of Drug Policy Analysis.

== Author ==
In 1989, Kleiman wrote Marijuana: Costs of Abuse, Costs of Control, in which he attacked the conventional reasoning of national drug enforcement and the logic behind interpretations of the economics of drug markets. The book included a critique of the "Just Say No" rhetoric of the Reagan and Bush administrations, and suggested an alternative policy of "grudging toleration" of drug use.

In 1993, Kleiman wrote Against Excess: Drug Policy for Results, where, he argued that drug enforcement agencies should view arrest and incarceration of offenders as a loss not a win. He maintained that by concentrating resources on ensuring certain arrest for the worst offenders rather than a small risk of arrest for all, agencies could create environments with less drug abuse, less incarceration, and safer streets.

In 2010, Kleiman wrote When Brute Force Fails: How to Have Less Crime and Less Punishment.

In 2011, Kleiman co-wrote Drugs and Drug Policy: What Everyone Needs to Know with Jonathan Caulkins and Angela Hawken. That year, Kleiman also co-edited Encyclopedia of Drug Policy with James Hawdon.

Kleiman's book Marijuana Legalization: What Everyone Needs to Know co-written with Jonathan Caulkins, Angela Hawken, and Beau Kilmer, was published in 2012. The book is written in question-and-answer format, covering over 100 questions relating to marijuana.

== Advising roles ==
Kleiman and his firm, Botec Analysis, were selected to advise Washington state in its regulation of legalized recreational marijuana in 2013. In a Huffington Post interview, Kleiman said he was concerned that the National Cannabis Industry Association would favor profits over public health. He also said that it could become a predatory body like the lobbying arms of the tobacco and alcohol industries. Kleiman said: "The fact that the National Cannabis Industry Association has hired itself a K Street suit [lobbyist] is not a good sign."

Botec also established a niche expertise in illicit tobacco markets, including work for Philip Morris International and Cornerstone Research.

== Other activities ==
Kleiman was the organizer of a group blog, The Reality-Based Community. His writing also appeared on CNN, The American Prospect, Foreign Affairs, and Washington Monthly.

During an interview with PBS Frontline Kleiman argued that "D.A.R.E. is a wonderful tool for police-community relations, particularly, in poor neighborhoods," though he added, "What D.A.R.E. is not, is a complete drug prevention program. In fact, the evaluations have been pretty, uniformly discouraging."

Kleiman was a legislative aide to Congressman Les Aspin (1974-1975) and a special assistant to Polaroid CEO Edwin Land (1975-1976). From 1977 to 1979, he was deputy director for management and director of program analysis for the Office of Management and Budget of the city of Boston. From 1979 to 1983, Kleiman worked for the Office of Policy and Management Analysis in the Criminal Division of the U.S. Department of Justice, and in 1982-1983 he was its director and a member of the National Organized Crime Planning Council.

== Death and legacy ==
Kleiman died July 21, 2019, of complications from a kidney transplant.

The National Academies of Sciences, Engineering, and Medicine host the annual Mark Kleiman Innovation for Public Policy Memorial Lecture, a competitive prize intended to honor early-career scholars whose work continues Kleiman's legacy of challenging policy orthodoxy through intellectual rigor.
