= Singapore Canoe Federation =

National governing body for canoeing and kayaking in Singapore

The Singapore Canoe Federation (SCF) formed in 1971, is the National Sports Association (NSA) responsible for the management, coordination, development and promotion of canoeing in Singapore. It also represents the interest of its athletes and members to the Singapore Sports Council, Singapore National Olympic Council, as well as other international canoeing bodies.

As a National Sports Association under the Sport Singapore, and as an affiliate of both the International Canoe Federation and the Asian Canoe Confederation, SCF represents Singapore in international and regional matters on canoeing.

== History ==
The SCF was formed in 1971. In 1977, SCF held the first national canoeing championships along side Pesta Sukan (Sports Festival) held by the government.

== Organisation ==
The Council of the years 2015-2017 SCF consists of President Yip Kwan Guan, Vice Presidents Zason Chian, Francis Ng, Roy Chew and Gideon Lu, Hon Secretary Henry Sim, Asst Hon Secretary Qui Yunru, Hon Treasurer Yeung Xintian and Asst Hon Treasurer Richard Tan.

== Funding ==
As a non-profit organisation, SCF is run by handful of full-time staffs together with Management Council and Executive who are volunteers from various water sports clubs and organisations. The Sports SG and Singapore Pools are the federation's main sponsors.
