= The Company (Hawaiian organized crime) =

Organized crime syndicate based in Hawaii

- Founded by: Wilford Pulawa
- Founding location: Hawaii
- Years active: 1970s-1991
- Territory: Hawaii, California, Alaska, Florida, Texas, New York, Washington, Arizona, Nevada, New Mexico, Georgia
- Ethnicity: Polynesian, Native Hawaiians, Tahitians, Samoans, Tongans
- Criminal activities: Racketeering, bookmaking, illegal gambling, drug trafficking, murder, extortion, weapons trafficking, loan-sharking, prostitution, money laundering, burglary
- Rivals: 14K Triad, Yamaguchi-gumi, San Francisco crime family

The Company, also called the Hawaiian Syndicate, is the name given to an organized crime syndicate based in Hawaii that controlled criminal activities in the state from the late 1960s to the mid-1990s.

== History ==
Through the 1960s, organized crime in Hawaii was controlled primarily by local Asian criminal organizations, mainly Chinese Triads, Japanese Yakuza, Korean Kkangpae, and Samoan criminal outfits. The first change came when a local Korean named George Chung formed his own criminal organization in 1962, recruiting among local Koreans, Japanese, Chinese, Samoans, and Native Hawaiians.

The smaller ethnic gangs all vied for control of organized crime, leading to disorganized clashes, over time Chung was able to create an environment where every gang could do business. In July 1967, Chung was shot to death in a Honolulu gambling den.

Chung's death led to a power vacuum of organized criminal activity in the islands, with crime bosses rivaling over control. A primarily Samoan mob under the leadership of Alema Leota briefly took over. In 1969, Wilford Pulawa, a Native Hawaiian and lieutenant of Leota, decided to recruit primarily among other local criminals of Native Hawaiian heritage and form the statewide crime syndicate that would become known as The Company.

== Wilford "Nappy" Pulawa ==
Under Pulawa's leadership, The Company extended a firm hold over the criminal rackets on the island, resorting to extreme violence when necessary. The organization became involved primarily in illegal gambling, prostitution in the islands' resort hotels, racketeering of local labor unions, the extortion of local legal and illegal businesses, and in the wide-scale illegal trade in Chinese white heroin. Under Pulawa, the organization extorted tribute from anyone wanting to do business in Hawaii, such as mainland mafia members, bookmakers, and gambling operators. The Company was able to exert some of its criminal control into Hawaiian communities on the mainland, mainly in Nevada and California. The syndicate made connections with figures in the American Mafia, but in some cases also had a rivalry with some of them. Rumor has it that once, when two Chicago mobsters active in Las Vegas were sent to Hawaii to teach a local Hawaiian gang leader a lesson for muscling in on illegal gambling rackets in Nevada, The Company killed the two mob thugs and returned their chopped-up bodies to the mainland in the back of a trunk with a note attached: "Delicious, send more."

Pulawa's reign ended in 1973 when he was starting to heavily invest criminal money in the real estate business. When law enforcement got wind of Pulawa's plans to buy several resort facilities in California, they were able to arrest him on tax evasion. He was jailed in 1975 and was sentenced to serve 24 years in federal prison, much of which he served at McNeil Island in Washington. He was paroled in 1984 and returned to the island to become involved in labor issues. Meanwhile, other heavyweights within The Company had started to fight over control of the vast criminal organization which had inserted itself in many aspects of the Hawaiian life, such as the entertainment field, the fishing industry, and organized labor, as well as Hawaiian cultural and rights groups.

== Post-Pulawa years ==
When Pulawa's leadership ended, The Company became more prone to infighting because several lieutenants and criminal families were competing for leadership. Names in the Hawaiian underworld such as the Joseph family, Ronald Kainalu Ching, and Henry Huihui all became increasingly well known in criminal activities and murder cases.

Charles Marsland, a Honolulu city prosecutor whose 19-year-old son's murder was supposedly tied to organized crime, set out to deal a heavy blow to the underworld. In 1984, Marsland's organized crime strike force, in cooperation with federal investigators, was able to arrest Huihui and Ching. Both gangsters decided to cooperate and Huihui turned an informant for the federal government. Both were brought into connection with countless criminal activities and murders and brought others down with them. Huihui was indicted in April 1984 on federal racketeering charges of gambling and extortion, as well as state charges of murder. Ching was sentenced to four life terms for four murders in August 1985.

The Joseph family and their main man Charlie Stevens, who controlled organized crime along the Waianae Coast, stayed active until the beginning of the 1990s. In 1991, Stevens was arrested on charges of criminal activities such as illegal gambling, extortion, kidnapping, drug trafficking, and murder. In May 1993, Stevens was sentenced to 20 years without parole.

The indictments of several powerful members of The Company ended the organization's reign over statewide organized crime on the island. Remnants of the syndicate and connected, younger Native Hawaiian criminals are still active and hold a degree of power over the island's underworld, but the pervasive total power over the entire state is a thing of the past. Currently, organized crime in Hawaii is closer to what it was in the 1960s with different ethnic organized crime groups such as Triads, Yakuza, Korean, Samoan criminal organizations, and Native Hawaiian crime syndicates, including remnants of The Company, all operating their own criminal businesses in the state.

== In popular culture ==
The Company is used in the first season of the Magnum P.I. reboot, as a gang which has resurged since their reign ended in the 1990s.

== See also ==
- Crime in Hawaii
