= Hawaiian sugar strike of 1946 =

Labor strike on the Hawaiian sugar plantations

The Hawaiian sugar strike of 1946 was one of the most expensive strikes in history. This strike involved almost all of the plantations in Hawaii, creating a cost of over $15 million in crop and production. This strike would become one of the leading causes for social change throughout the territory.

== Background ==
By 1835, massive plantations on the islands experienced large scale growth. To keep up with the increasing demand for labour, the plantation owners began to import workers in 1865. Immigrant workers and their families flooded in from China, Korea, Portugal, the Philippines, Puerto Rico, and Japan. Company recruits were extremely selective in their choice of workers. Education was of no value to them, and conditions in Hawai'i were poor. The companies owned all living quarters and stores near the plantations, which kept the workers isolated from the rest of the island. All of the camps were racially segregated adding further to the isolation of workers. The companies also had close ties with the utility companies and government officials. To help keep wages low, the companies would pay all utilities, health care, fuel, and more. Their relationships with government helped to prevent legislation being passed in favour of the workers. The field managers were all armed, would ride on horseback carrying whips, and would follow the workers relentlessly. With such poor living conditions, low pay, demanding labour, and harsh oppression, strikes were not unusual. However, because of the heavy segregation, the strikes mainly consisted of one ethnicity and were extremely unorganised, thus always doomed to fail.

Fortunately, massive change was just around the corner. In 1935, the National Labor Relations Act was passed, allowing for legal union organisation in United States territories. Soon after the passing of the law, union activists began to enter Hawai'i to help activate its workers.

On August 1, 1938, members of the International Longshore and Warehouse Union (ILWU), along with those of several other unions, organised a strike against launderers, auto dealers, warehouses, and vessels for better wages and union shops. Out of the 200 peaceful protesters who gathered, 50 of them were injured in attempts by police to disband them. When tear gas, bayonets, and hoses failed, the police resorted to using firearms on the unarmed protesters. This tragic day became known as the "Hilo Massacres" or "Hawaii's Bloody Monday" and led to further organisation in the islands.

== The strike ==
After the Pearl Harbor bombing in 1941, martial law was declared on the islands. Labour organisation was halted in its tracks by the freezing of wages, suspension of labour contracts, prohibiting employees from switching to new employers, and by a major influx of military personnel who were paid more for doing the same jobs. Discrimination was also a leading cause of stagnation in union movements. All community sports teams, clubs, and organisations were dismantled. Only one athletic club, the "Surf Riders," remained because its name was in English. This group became a cornerstone for the community and worker organisations.

By 1943, martial law was lifted and community and worker organisation resumed. Union organisers had each camp assign a leader who was then recruited and trained. Whenever a president of a group was elected, the elected vice president was required to be of a different ethnicity. This way there was no majority in power, everyone felt as though they were being equally represented, and everyone learned to work together. This electoral standard was just one of the many techniques used for uniting the community. However, organisation was not easy. Although the National Relations Labor Act ensured workers' rights to organise, it did not specify ways or means of enforcing that right. Employees had to meet in secret, often after dark and even in bathrooms where they would pass cards under the stall walls. When being pursued, workers would have to seek refuge on US property where the Hawaiian police could not arrest them. The workers found endless humour in these simple manoeuvres. Whenever someone was arrested before or during the strike, the union would provide lawyers for legal representation.

By 1945, the union was well established. They had achieved their first industry-wide contract guaranteeing a 43.5 cent per hour minimum wage for all employees. To the workers, the minimum wage was a good start, but it was just a beginning. In order for the leaders of the worker communities to learn how to better represent the needs of their fellow employees, a committee of 10 was selected to go to the mainland and attend the California Labor School. There they learned about labour laws, how to conduct strikes, how to maintain relations with workers and companies, and much more. The committee members attended strikes around the US west coast to observe other leaders and unions in action. They would discuss how to organise, feed the strikers, keep up morale, and how to negotiate. All they learned in the states would be extremely useful in the coming months.

Because of the martial law during World War II, the companies faced major labour shortages. Once it was lifted, they returned to the old tactics of recruiting poor, uneducated, immigrant workers, this time mainly from the war-torn Philippines. However, what the companies didn't expect was that there would be union representatives on the boats that were used to ship the new workers. This allowed the unions to recruit new members before the boats even docked. Most workers stepped off the boats with union cards in hand, ready for a new and better life. Those who had not already signed up were quickly persuaded to do so in the camps. Unionists went from door to door telling them that this wasn't just for themselves, but for their children too. (Melanie Hicken, Business Insider, "Most Expensive Strikes in History". Feb. 29, 2012.)

In 1946, the union made its new demands. They wanted a 65 cent per hour minimum, a 40-hour work week, a union shop, and for the perquisites (the system used to keep wages low by providing health care, fuel, utilities, etc.) to be replaced by cash. The workers knew the importance of the perquisite system. They knew that the only way to wrest full control from the companies was to end the system. With union demands being so high, the companies gave a counter offer of 50 cents per hour minimum, a 48-hour work week, cash for the perquisites, and no union shop. Unsatisfied, the union called a strike. On September 1, 1946, 33 out of the 34 sugar factories with over 25,000 employees went on strike, and picket lines were established.

To prevent strikers from damaging company property, a union police force was created. This police force also prohibited gambling. A transportation unit moved workers to wherever they were needed and food kitchens were set up. Several morale and entertainment committees were formed to arrange musical performances, movies, and other programs. A hunting and fishing committee was also established to help feed the strikers and their families. In an attempt to discourage strikers, the sugar companies made agreements with rice companies to no longer sell rice in stores, forcing the ILWU to have to import rice from the mainland. When police prevented the strikers from picketing, they would parade through the cities on the islands. Most importantly, the union leaders organised the strikers who were entitled to vote to help gain political support. In the 1946 local elections, 35 union-supporting candidates were elected to office, thus putting an end to Republican control. All attempts at 'red baiting' by the companies failed miserably, and laws were passed to help the workers rather than the employers.

Because so many employees were no longer receiving wages, the unions made deals with landlords to keep the workers in their shacks. They threatened that if anyone was evicted, they would all march down to city hall to demand that provision be made for them. During the entire strike, not a single worker was evicted. Finally, after 79 days the strike ended on November 17, 1946. With 19 cents per hour more (depending on paid wages), a 46-hour work week, and end to the perquisite system, the union declared victory. Though they didn't get the union shop, the workers still rejoiced in the respect and recognition that they had earned.

== Aftermath ==
No longer would they be harassed by armed managers on horseback in the fields. However this prosperity would not last as long as the strikers had hoped. One-by-one, the sugar factories and plantations began to shut down. By 1996, only 3 plantations remained, employing only 2,000 people. The once strong and thriving communities of the workers are now declining in size and rising in crime. With an increasingly tourist based economy rather than production, descendants of the 1946 strikers have had to search for jobs elsewhere. There is no sign of improved conditions for the Hawai'i sugar industry in the future anywhere.

Important People: Jack Hall: Arrived in Hawai'i in 1935 to help organize unions. By 1946, he became director of ILWU. Harry Bridges: A union organizer who was a leading target for the companies red baiting. Harriet Bouslog: A union lawyer. She was 1 of only 17 women between 1888 and 1959 to be admitted into Hawaiian practice.
