= Hawaii's Opportunity Probation with Enforcement =

Crime prevention program in Hawaii

Hawaii's Opportunity Probation with Enforcement (HOPE) is an intensive supervision program that aims to reduce crime and drug use while saving taxpayers' dollars spent on jail and prison costs. HOPE deals with offenders who have been identified as likely to violate the conditions of their probation or community supervision.

HOPE participants include offenders who have committed a violent crime, including sex offenders and domestic violence offenders, reaching a demographic of abusers untouched by Drug Court programs. Unlike Drug Court and other substance-abuse treatment programs, HOPE does not attempt to impose drug treatment on every participant. Under HOPE, probationers receive drug treatment only if they continue to test positive for drug use or if they request a treatment referral.

HOPE employs a warning hearing notifying offenders at the onset that detected violations will have consequences; conducts frequent and random drug tests; responds to detected violations - including failed drug tests and skipped probation meetings - with swift, certain and appropriate terms of incarceration; responds to absconding probationers with quickly enforced warrant service and sanctions; and mandates drug treatment only upon request or for those probationers who do not abstain from drug use while on the testing and sanctions regimen.

== HOPE model ==
The HOPE model was started by Hawaii State Judiciary First Circuit Court Judge Steven Alm in an effort to address what he viewed as a farcical probation system. It was often seen that drug-offenders would violate their probation, despite the relatively relaxed guidelines of their punishment. The punishment for violating these rules was often slow and cumbersome. To address the high rates of recidivism, Judge Steven Alm focused on delivering swift, certain and proportionate sanctions to those who failed to comply with the rules. HOPE participants receive randomized and frequent drug tests throughout the duration of the program. Probationers are warned that if they test positive for drugs they will be arrested immediately, and warrants will be issued immediately for probationers who miss an appointment or a drug test. Those found guilty face a short stint in jail - usually 2 - 3 days, but this number increases with repeated violations.

When offenders are placed on probation rather than being sent to prison, it is typically for 4 years. The court, pursuant to Hawaii Revised Statutes (HRS) Sec. 706-624(2)(a), can impose a term of imprisonment not exceeding two years in Class A felony cases, eighteen months in Class B felony cases, and one year in Class C felony cases.

If a court at any point revokes probation under HRS 706-625, the judge may impose on the defendant any sentence that might have been imposed originally for the crime of which the defendant was convicted. A person who is convicted of a Class A felony is subject to an indeterminate term of imprisonment of twenty years. A person sentenced to prison for a Class B felony is subject to an indeterminate term of imprisonment of ten years. A person sentenced to prison for a Class C felony is subject to an indeterminate term of imprisonment of five years.

HOPE probation requires close coordination among many different criminal justice system agencies.

=== Warning hearings ===
Participation in a HOPE "warning hearing" is the mandatory first step for a person after being recommended by his or her probation officer and being accepted by the judge.

The warning hearings take place in a group format in open court. The probationers, their attorneys, and the prosecutor appear in person before the judge, who impresses on each probationer the importance of compliance and the certainty of consequences for noncompliance. HOPE probationers are warned that positive drug tests and/or admissions to drug and/or alcohol use will result in an immediate, on-the-spot arrest, and missing a drug test or a probation appointment will result in the immediate issuance of a bench warrant. Also, HOPE probationers are told they are expected to acknowledge when they have violated and not to abscond from the system. Absconding offenders will face harsher sanctions than those who do not run away.

During the hearing, the judge emphasizes personal responsibility and the hope of all involved that the probationer succeed.

=== Drug testing hotline ===
The drug testing hotline is one of the major components of the HOPE program. Probationers are required to call the hotline recording every weekday of their probation and listen for the randomly selected colors of the day. Colors are assigned to probationers for privacy and efficiency reasons, and are reassigned as probationers progress in the program and their colors are called less frequently.

Probationers whose colors are named in the recording are required to report to the downtown Honolulu courthouse the same day for drug testing between 6:30AM and 2:30PM HST. The hotline is refreshed each day of the work week at 4:00AM HST.

During the first two months of HOPE, a probationer's color is called six times a month, becoming less frequent as the program continues and dwindling to a minimum of once a month. Exceptions for weekdays in which the hotline is not in service are state holidays.

To induce probationers to appear for testing even when they know their drug test will be positive, HOPE provides for more severe sanctions for those who abscond than for those who test positive for drugs but admit and turn themselves in. To make the threat effective, law enforcement officers are available to promptly arrest those who failed to appear.

=== HOPE probation modification hearings ===
A HOPE probation modification hearing is held shortly after a probationer has been arrested for violating the terms and conditions of his or her probation, often within two working days. High bail is set, and the probationer is usually confined in the interim.

A probationer found to have violated the terms of probation is immediately sentenced to a short jail stay (typically several days servable on the weekend if employed, but increasing with continued non-compliance), with credit given for time served.

The probationer resumes participation in HOPE and reports to his or her probation officers on the day of release.

Unlike a probation revocation, a modification order does not sever the probation relationship.

A probationer may request a treatment referral at any time, but probationers with multiple violations are mandated to intensive substance abuse treatment services (typically residential care). The court continues to supervise the probationer throughout the treatment experience and the probationer is still subject to court-ordered sanctions for noncompliance.

== HOPE history ==
The HOPE program was launched in 2004 by Judge Steven Alm, a now-retired First Circuit Judge, in an effort to reduce probation violations by high risk offenders.

Alm's inspiration stemmed from a mid-1990s presentation by David M. Kennedy about an intensely supervisional deterrence program for Boston youth gangs, called Operation Ceasefire.

Mirroring the supervision aspect of Operation Ceasefire, Alm created HOPE probation. The first HOPE probation hearings, held October 1, 2004, had 18 sex offenders and 16 drug offenders.

== HOPE program results ==
Early reported results were promising. In a 12-month follow-up study, 61% of HOPE probationers had zero positive drug tests, 20% had one positive drug test, 9% had two, 5% had three, and less than 5% had four or more. Only 10% of the HOPE probationers needed further drug treatment.

A randomized controlled study compared probationers assigned to HOPE (n = 330) to individuals assigned to regular probation (n = 163). After one year, HOPE probationers were 55% less likely to be arrested for a new crime, 72% less likely to use drugs, 61% less likely to miss appointments with their supervisory officers, and 53% less likely to have their probation revoked than those on regular probation. HOPE participants were sentenced on average to 48% fewer days of prison than regular probationers.

However, several more long-term studies, funded by the National Institutes of Health, were not able to replicate the earlier promising findings. Although the HOPE field experiments showed reductions in property and drug offenses, there were no similar reductions in probation violations and revocations across the board.

The 2016 study Outcome Findings from the HOPE Demonstration Field Experiment, published in Criminology & Public Policy, also concluded that HOPE did not achieve significant reductions in re-arrests of “moderate to high-risk probationers,” when compared to standard probation programs.

== Issues about HOPE program ==
A 2014 assessment identifies seven issues about the effectiveness of the HOPE project:

1. An Over-Emphasis on a Potentially Weak Key Ingredient: the use of swift-and-certain sanctions. HOPE assumes that specific deterrence is the key to enforcing compliance with probation conditions and reducing recidivism. Little evidence exists that specific-deterrence programs are consistently effective with correctional populations, using the failure of the "Scared Straight" program as an example.

2. An Under-Emphasis on Active Key Ingredients: HOPE emphasizes drug and alcohol treatment, but that is only one of several factors leading to criminal behavior. To truly impact recidivism, HOPE must also target antisocial attitudes, associates, and behavioral patterns; familial relationships; problems in education and employment; and poor use of leisure time.

3. Failure to Identify Alternative Explanations for HOPE's Effectiveness: James Finckenauer has used the term "panacea phenomenon" to describe initiatives that, "with very little criminological or empirical scrutiny, arise, are quickly embraced, and are imposed on the wayward with very little understanding of their true impact."

4. Over-Selling the Promise of Applicability for Other Jurisdictions: Most of the HOPE program was supported by relationships that Judge Alm had with different agencies within the state, helping to facilitate the start of HOPE using minimal funds. Other locations should not assume that this will hold true in their jurisdictions. For example, the replication of a HOPE-like program in Delaware quickly encountered a series of unanticipated problems: too many offenders failed urine tests, too rapidly; there was strain on personnel who had to transport those failing drug tests immediately to facilities located one to two-and-a-half hours away; there was a legal requirement to accord all incarcerated offenders a medical check-up and to hold a judicial revocation hearing for offenders who exceeded the maximum of 10 incarceration days; and there was the exclusion from the program of offenders with specific conditions of probation (e.g., zero-tolerance for a single failed urine test).

5. Delivering an Intervention That May be Inappropriate for Some Offenders: Although Hawaii's HOPE program includes a variety of offenders (sex, property, assault), its evaluation studies have only been performed on drug-involved offenders. Too much punishment can prompt “learned helplessness and retaliatory aggression” and too little will fail to suppress the conduct.

6. Focusing on Something That Might Not Matter: An entire probation system ia reorganized to focus its primary attention on compliance with probation conditions. Resources devoted to swift-and-certain punishment cannot be devoted, for example, to increasing probationers’ low rate of participation in evidence-based programming found to reduce recidivism, such as promoting positive social bonds and gainful employment.

7. Opening a Pandora's Box through Punishment-Oriented Probation: When hiring probation officers, the emphasis will be on their enforcement skills, not on their interpersonal talents; "policing, not social work, will be valued. And when jurisdictions exhaust their ability to improve swiftness and certainty, they will seek to reduce violations and recidivism with the only component of punishment remaining in their arsenal: severity."

The above assessment relies heavily on the work of Hawken and Kleiman, faculty members at the School of Public Policy.
