= Steve Alm =

Prosecuting Attorney of Honolulu

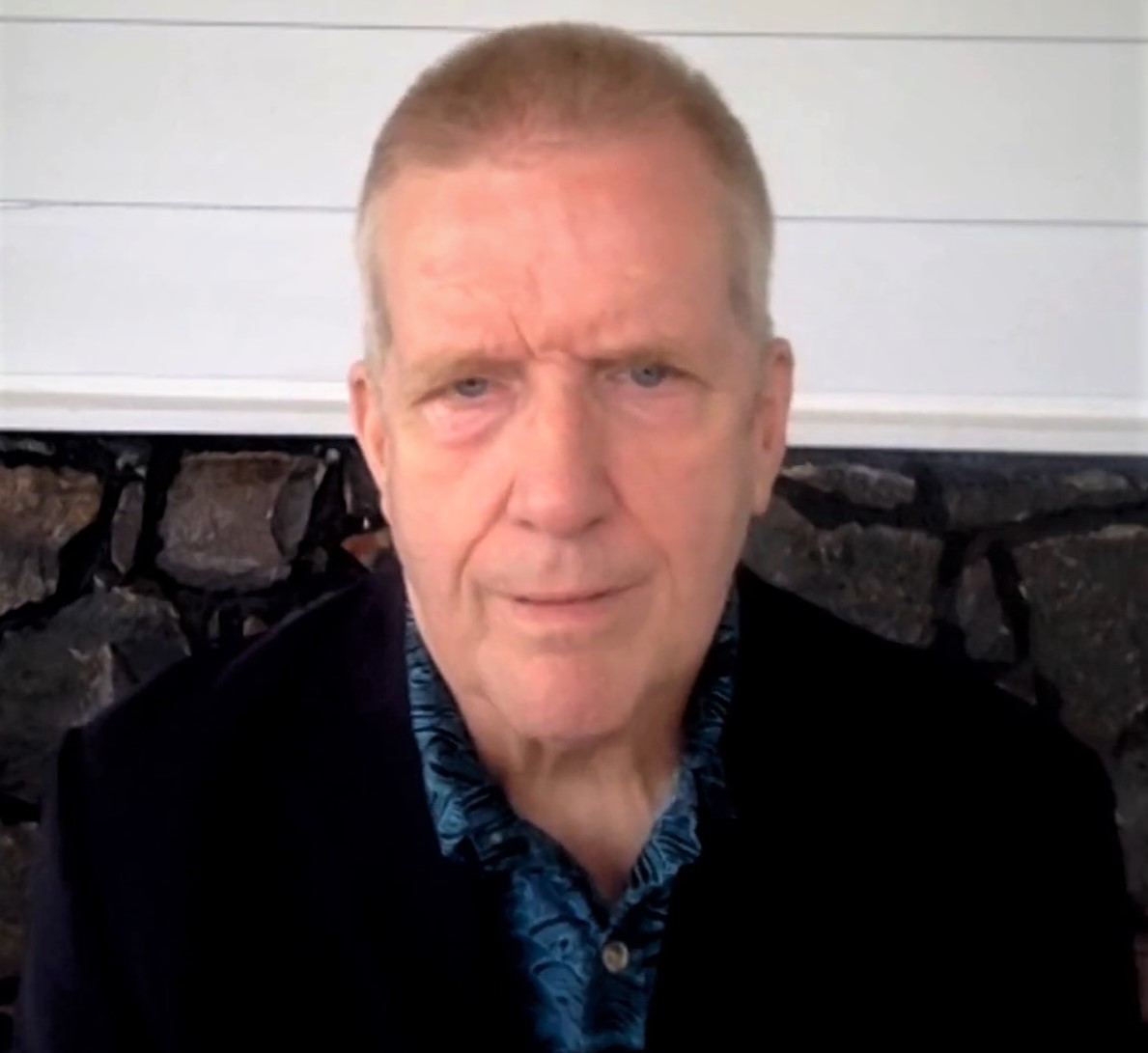
- Alm in 2020

Prosecuting Attorney of Honolulu
- Incumbent
- Assumed office January 2, 2021

Hawaii Circuit Court judge
- In office 2001–2016

United States Attorney for the District of Hawaii
- In office 1994–2001
- Appointed by: Bill Clinton

Personal details
- Born: Steven S. Alm; 1953 or 1954 (age 72–73) Honolulu, Territory of Hawaii, U.S.
- Children: 1
- Education: University of Oregon

Steven S. Alm is an American lawyer who is the current Prosecuting Attorney of Honolulu. A former Hawaii circuit court judge and United States Attorney, he was sworn into the position of prosecutor on January 2, 2021.

== Early life and education ==
Alm was born in Honolulu, living in Manoa and later Kaimuki. His parents were professors at the University of Hawaiʻi College of Education, and he and his brother attended University Lab School. He worked for Dole Cannery in the summers, beginning after tenth grade, and later as a taxi driver.

Alm attended the University of Hawaiʻi at Mānoa for two years before making a college transfer to the University of Oregon, where he received undergraduate and graduate degrees in education. While at the University of Oregon, he met his future wife, Haunani; they have one son.

=== Legal qualifications ===
Alm attended the McGeorge School of Law in Sacramento and passed the Hawaii bar in October 1985.

== Career ==
After working at West Publishing Company from 1983 to 1985, Alm began his legal career in the office of the Prosecuting Attorney of Honolulu in 1985, where he was director of the division focused on the district court and family court.

=== U.S. Attorney ===
Alm was appointed the United States Attorney for the District of Hawaii by Bill Clinton in 1994, and led the local Weed and Seed program, coordinating law enforcement and providers of social services for a crime prevention effort in Chinatown and Kalihi–Pālama. He has claimed that the program reduced crime in those areas by 70% over three years, and that the rate began to rise again after he left the U.S. Attorney position.

=== Circuit court judge ===
Alm subsequently served as a judge on the Hawaii First Circuit Court from 2001 to 2016. In 2004, he founded Hawaii's Opportunity Probation with Enforcement (HOPE), a program intended to reduce violations of probation by people at high risk for recidivism, especially people arrested for drug-related crimes. The program went on to be used in some form by 32 other states. He retired from his position as a judge on August 31, 2016, and was subsequently honored by the Honolulu City Council for his founding of and advocacy for HOPE.

=== Prosecuting Attorney of Honolulu ===
After campaigning with the endorsement of the State of Hawaii Organization of Police Officers on a platform of restoring the public's trust in the prosecutor's office, and defeating former Honolulu Deputy Prosecutor Megan Kau in the election for the position, Alm was elected to a four-year term as Prosecuting Attorney of Honolulu. He was sworn in on January 2, 2021 by Mark E. Recktenwald at Neal S. Blaisdell Center. He was 67 years old at the time. Dozens of people were additionally sworn in as deputy prosecutors during the ceremony. In addition to restoring public trust, Alm additionally stated his intent to train deputy prosecutors in ethics and trial skills, divide them into specialized teams, and consider restructuring the office. In his 100-day plan, which was shared in a press conference on January 12, 2021, Alm shared that he intended to be more aggressive in prosecuting crimes including domestic violence and child sex trafficking; he also expressed support for the Honolulu Police Department in investigating home invasions targeting old people.
