= The Kennedys of Massachusetts =

- Screenplay by: William Hanley
- Directed by: Lamont Johnson
- Starring: William Petersen; Annette O'Toole; Charles Durning; Tracy Pollan; Pat Hingle; Steven Weber; Campbell Scott; Madolyn Smith; Josef Sommer
- Music by: David Shire
- Country of origin: United States
- Original language: English
- No. of episodes: 3

Production
- Producers: Michael Barnathan; Mitch Engel; Gary Hoffman; Lynn Raynor; Edgar J. Scherick
- Editor: Susan B. Browdy
- Running time: 278 minutes
- Production companies: Edgar J. Scherick Associates; Orion Television

Original release
- Network: ABC
- Release: February 18 – February 21, 1990

The Kennedys of Massachusetts is a 1990 television miniseries that aired on ABC. Focusing mainly on the fifty-four-year marriage of Joseph P. Kennedy Sr. and Rose Kennedy. The events depicted in the series are based upon the book by Doris Kearns Goodwin titled The Fitzgeralds and the Kennedys : An American Saga. The series aired across three nights, and earned an Emmy and a Golden Globe.

== Synopsis ==
The series begins in Boston on January 1, 1906, with John F. Fitzgerald being sworn in as mayor. The Kennedys, headed by P. J. Kennedy, as well as Fitzgerald's daughters, most notably the eldest Rose, attend the swearing-in ceremony. Joe Kennedy is attracted to Rose, and engages her in conversation when both families are on vacation at Old Orchard Beach, Maine, later in the year; her father does not approve of their relationship. Mayor Fitzgerald, attempting to curry favor with the Catholic church ahead of a looming corruption trial, decides to send Rose to study at the Blumenthal Convent in Holland instead of the "hotbed of female socialist ferment", Wellesley College—despite his earlier encouragement of her education. Joe sympathizes with Rose's disappointment and the pair exchange letters during his studies at Harvard College and her time overseas at the convent school. During the corruption trial, Mayor Fitzgerald claims to not remember awarding contracts to his friends. Although Joe does well at Harvard academically, he still feels like an outsider, not allowed into the most privileged clubs (such as the Porcellian Club) and social gatherings. Upon graduating, Joe asks Fitzgerald to bring the fact that Massachusetts has never had an Irish Catholic bank examiner to the attention of Governor Foss and lands the job. After Rose returns to America and Joe becomes the "youngest bank president" at age twenty-five, she finally agrees to marry him.

By 1919, the Kennedys have had three children, Joseph Jr., Jack, and Rosemary. After a New Year's Eve party, a pregnant Rose, feeling unfulfilled, declares her intention to move back in with her parents. Her father eventually convinces her to return to her husband and children, and she gives birth to their fourth child, Kick. A year later, Jack contracts scarlet fever and his father rushes to the hospital to see him. The Kennedys consult with a doctor about Rosemary because she is not developing at a normal rate and are told that she has a mental handicap.

Joe buys film company Film Booking Offices of America (FBO) and moves the family to New York, over Rose's objections. In 1927, he meets actress Gloria Swanson for lunch at the Savoy-Plaza Hotel, agreeing to sign her to his company despite his earlier opposition to her making the controversial film Sadie Thompson (released 1928).

In the second episode, Joe begins an affair with Swanson and travels back and forth between the east and west coast. By this time, the Kennedys have had three more children, Eunice, Pat, and Bobby; their youngest daughter, Jean, is born in 1928. Joe hires Austrian director Erich von Stroheim, director of Greed (1924) to make Swanson's next picture, Queen Kelly. However, Swanson finds Stroheim difficult to work with, with the director making unusual suggestions such as using real flies for scenes set in Africa. Swanson urges Joe to come to California to comfort her at the same time his father P. J. is hospitalized for liver disease; he is with her when his father dies, missing the funeral.

By January 1932, Joe has gotten out of the motion picture business, having also sold most of his stocks before the 1929 Crash. In February, Rose gives birth to their ninth and last child, Edward Moore "Ted". She then asks for separate bedrooms and hints that she always knew about Joe's affairs. Joe and his assistant Eddie Moore (namesake of Ted) visit Franklin D. Roosevelt at his retreat in Warm Springs, Georgia; Joe offers him financial support, and mentions that Joe Jr. may be "presidential timbre". FDR's advisor Louis Howe does not trust Kennedy, but FDR takes a liking to him. Joe attends the Democratic National Convention, at which Roosevelt gains the Democratic nomination. John Fitzgerald and the Kennedy children watch a newsreel of the convention. In May 1933, the family celebrates Joe Jr.'s graduation from the Choate School in Connecticut, at which he is awarded the Harvard Trophy for his athletic achievement. Jack feels overshadowed by his older brother, but his grandfather encourages him.

In December 1937, President Roosevelt meets with Joe and agrees to appoint him ambassador to the United Kingdom. The entire family eventually follows him to England. As ambassador, Joe supports Prime Minister Neville Chamberlain's policy of appeasement towards Adolf Hitler and "peace at any price", and rejects King George VI's suggestion that he would like a more formal alliance. Kathleen attends formal parties and is named "most exciting debutante of nineteen-thirty-eight" by the newspapers. Jack disagrees with his father's continuing belief in appeasement when Germany demands the Sudetenland in Czechoslovakia. At an outdoor party, Kathleen meets Billy Cavendish, Marquess of Hartington. After Germany invades Poland, Joe tells FDR the British will honor their commitment and declare war unless Germany pulls out, remarking "It’s the end of the world, Mr. President". Joe sends the family back to America, and Kathleen bids a sad farewell to Billy.

At Harvard College in 1940, John Fitzgerald suggests Joe Jr. begin his political career by serving as a delegate for Massachusetts to the Democratic National Convention, although Massachusetts' delegates are pledged to Roosevelt's opponent, James Farley. Jack tells them his thesis “Appeasement in Munich” has been accepted for publication as a book, on the recommendation of journalist Arthur Krock; Joe Jr. suggests that the publishers bowed to their father's pressure, which irritates Jack. Joe Jr. is told by his father not to stand as a delegate, but he does so anyway. Joe loses popularity in England, one newspaper even calling him a defeatist. Joe Jr. remains pledged to Farley despite pressure from chairman of the Massachusetts Democratic Party William Burke to support Roosevelt, until the convention votes by acclamation. Jack's book Why England Slept becomes a bestseller. Joe finally returns to America and is told by Rose that Rosemary has been moody and occasionally violent since their return from England, once leaving the house during the night and wandering up and down the block in her nightgown. Joe confronts FDR about the State Department going over his head. Joe gives an interview to a group of reporters in which he says "Democracy is finished in England. It may be finished here" and "England is fighting for self-preservation". John Fitzgerald sharply reprimands Joe for his supposedly off-the-record interview, stating that he has finally cut his own throat with his tongue.

The third episode starts with the attack on Pearl Harbor on December 7, 1941, and the Kennedys listening to President Roosevelt's speech to the nation the day after. At their Palm Beach, Florida property in 1942, Rosemary has a violent tantrum, slamming her tennis racket against a fence. Joe consults a doctor who recommends a prefrontal lobotomy. While Rose is on a vacation to South America (and without her knowledge), Joe has Rosemary undergo the surgery. The procedure leaves Rosemary unable to walk or speak; Joe has her institutionalized at the St. Coletta School for Exceptional Children in Wisconsin. (This is a simplification: in reality, Rosemary spent several years at an institution in New York before being transferred to St. Coletta's). When Rose returns, she begs to see her daughter, but Joe does not allow her to.

In 1943, Jack is in the Navy as commander of a patrol torpedo boat stationed at Tulagi in the Solomon Islands, while Joe Jr. and Kathleen are back in England as a naval aviator and a Red Cross volunteer, respectively. Jack's role in the PT-109 incident is mentioned, but not shown. Kathleen and Billy Cavendish continue to see each other, and she eventually agrees to marry him; Rose is extremely distraught that her daughter is marrying an Anglican in a civil service, considering it "no marriage at all, not in the eyes of God". Jack returns to America, relying on a wheelchair due to the back injury he sustained in the PT-109 crash. Joe Jr. romances Pat Wilson, a (married) English woman. He has flown his required number of missions, but nevertheless volunteers for Operation Aphrodite/Anvil, an early experiment in drone warfare in which bombers are laden with explosives and flown by remote control. The explosives aboard the modified B-24 flown by Lt. Joseph P. Kennedy Jr. and Lt. Wilford John Willy explode prematurely, killing them. Kathleen, now Lady Hartington, returns home, and Rose accepts her back into the family with some awkwardness. Shortly thereafter, they receive word Billy has been killed in Belgium.

After the war ends, Joe transfers his hopes for Joe Jr.'s political career onto Jack. Joe Kane, Joe's first cousin, convince Joe, John Fitzgerald, and Jack that Jack should run for Congress rather than Lieutenant Governor, as the incumbent representative James Curley decided to run for his fourth term as Mayor of Boston, leaving the seat open. Jack does well on the campaign trail, and invites his mother to speak to fellow Gold Star Mothers. One of his opponents for the 11th congressional district House seat, Women's Army Corps veteran Major Catherine Falvey, accuses him of being a "carpetbagger…trying to buy the election with his father’s money". Enraged, Joe orders Jack's campaign staff to stay out of limousines, and states that if Jack is caught in a limousine, Joe will run himself. Jack wins first the primary, and then the general election.

In September 1947, Jack visits Kathleen in the Kennedys' ancestral homeland, County Waterford, Ireland. He learns that Kathleen has entered a romance with Earl Peter Wentworth-Fitzwilliam, who is planning to divorce his wife. He tells his father of the relationship in his office at the Capitol, and Joe warns that Rose would not accept it if the Earl had "a halo and scars on his hands.” In a heated argument, Rose threatens to disown Kathleen if she marries Earl Fitzwilliam, and Kathleen tells her that "Drink isn’t the curse of the Irish, mother. Religion is the curse of the Irish". Kathleen Kennedy Cavendish and Earl Peter Fitzwilliam fly to Paris to meet Joe in 1948, but their plane encounters a storm and heavy turbulence, eventually crashing and killing them both.

At Bobby's wedding reception in 1950, John Fitzgerald tells Jack that he's proud that his grandson bears his name. Fitzgerald dies several months later. At the Hyannis Port Kennedy Compound on Thanksgiving, 1956, while Jack is polishing his boat, Joe convinces him to run for the Presidency. The Democrats nominate Kennedy as their presidential candidate for 1960. Kennedy and Nixon have live televised debates. Nixon carries more states, but Kennedy narrowly wins the popular vote and wins the electoral vote by a wide margin, winning the election. On January 20, 1961, with the Kennedys and his wife Jacqueline in attendance, John F. Kennedy is inaugurated as president of the United States and delivers his inaugural address.

== Cast ==
- William Petersen as Joseph P. "Joe" Kennedy Sr.
- Annette O'Toole as Rose Kennedy
- Charles Durning as John F. Fitzgerald
- Tracy Pollan as Kathleen "Kick" Kennedy
  - Kelsey Nichols: Ages 8–9
- Pat Hingle as P.J. Kennedy
- Steven Weber as John F. "Jack" Kennedy
  - Christina Nikitas: Ages 2–3
  - Thomas Krajewski: Ages 9–12
- Campbell Scott as Joseph P. "Joe" Kennedy Jr.
  - Dante Magnani: Ages 2–4
  - Michael Goodwin: Ages 11–12
- Madolyn Smith as Gloria Swanson
- Olek Krupa as Erich Von Stroheim
- Josef Sommer as Franklin D. Roosevelt
- Randle Mell as Robert F. "Bobby" Kennedy
  - Will Gardner: Age 7
  - Casey Affleck: Ages 12–15
- Kristen Kelly as Patricia "Pat" Kennedy
  - Karen Chaffee: Ages 13–14
- Ryan Shaugnessy and Matthew Dundas as Edward Moore "Ted" Kennedy: Shaughnessy plays Ted ages 5–6, and Dundas plays him at ages 12–14.
- Beth Herzig as Jean Kennedy
  - Danielle Schonback: Ages 9–12
- Deirdre Lovejoy as Rosemary Kennedy
  - Jennifer Walsh: Ages 1–4
  - Remi Nichols: Ages 8–11
- Halina Radosz as Eunice Kennedy

== Ratings ==
Television ratings for The Kennedys of Massachusetts
No.	Title	Air date	Timeslot (ET)	Rating/share (households)	Viewers (millions)	Ref(s)
1	"Part 1"	February 18, 1990	Sunday 9:00 p.m.	15.8/24	23.1	
2	"Part 2"	February 19, 1990	Monday 9:00 p.m.	17.6/27	24.4	
3	"Part 3"	February 21, 1990	Wednesday 9:00 p.m.	16.4/25	22.8	

== See also ==
- Cultural depictions of John F. Kennedy
