= Team of Rivals =

2005 book by Doris Kearns Goodwin

Team of Rivals: The Political Genius of Abraham Lincoln
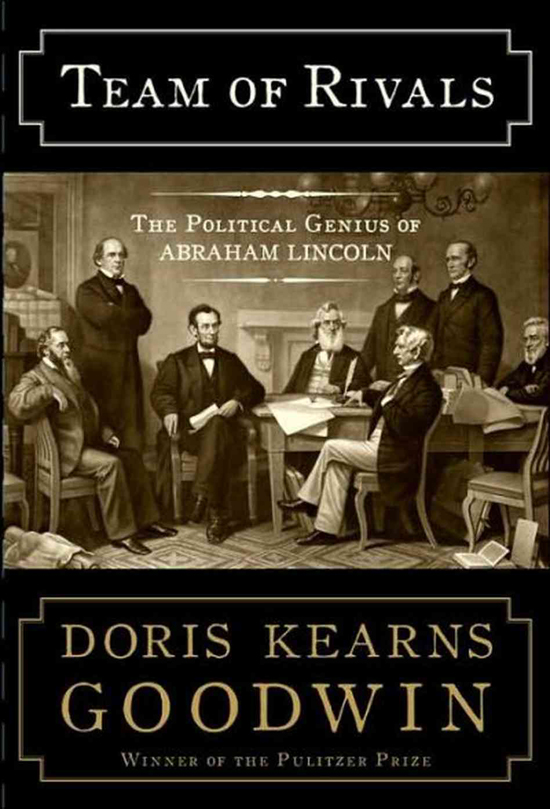
- Author: Doris Kearns Goodwin
- Publisher: Simon & Schuster
- Publication date: October 25, 2005
- Pages: 944
- ISBN: 0-684-82490-6 (hardcover); ISBN 0-7432-7075-4 (paperback)
- OCLC: 61479616
- Dewey Decimal: 973.7092 B 22
- LC Class: E457.45 .G66 2005

Team of Rivals: The Political Genius of Abraham Lincoln is a 2005 book by Pulitzer Prize-winning American historian Doris Kearns Goodwin, published by Simon & Schuster. The book is a biographical portrait of U.S. President Abraham Lincoln and some of the men who served with him in his cabinet from 1861 to 1865. Three of his Cabinet members had previously run against Lincoln in the 1860 election: Attorney General Edward Bates, Secretary of the Treasury Salmon P. Chase and Secretary of State William H. Seward. The book focuses on Lincoln's mostly successful attempts to reconcile conflicting personalities and political factions on the path to abolition and victory in the American Civil War.

Goodwin's sixth book, Team of Rivals was well received by critics and won the 2006 Lincoln Prize and the inaugural Book Prize for American History of the New-York Historical Society. US President Barack Obama cited it as one of his favorite books and was said to have used it as a model for constructing his own cabinet, although he later wrote this was not the reason he chose Hillary Clinton as his Secretary of State. In 2012, a Steven Spielberg film based on the book was released to critical acclaim.

== Background ==
Team of Rivals is the sixth book by American historian Doris Kearns Goodwin. In 1995, Goodwin was awarded the Pulitzer Prize for History for her book No Ordinary Time: Franklin and Eleanor Roosevelt: The Home Front in World War II, a similar study of personalities in the Roosevelt White House.

Goodwin spent ten years on the research and writing of Team of Rivals. She stated that she had been inspired to tell the stories of the four men (Seward, Chase, Bates, and Lincoln) together when realizing that the cabinet members had written extensive diaries and letters that might provide a "new angle" in Lincoln studies.

During Goodwin's work on Team of Rivals, a plagiarism scandal erupted over unmarked quotations in Goodwin's 1987 book The Fitzgeralds and the Kennedys. Goodwin stated that in dealing with the scandal, during which she had to apologize and make an out-of-court settlement to author Lynne McTaggart, she found Lincoln a consolation, particularly his philosophy "not to waste precious energies on recriminations about the past". In a 2012 interview, Goodwin cited early 20th-century muckraker Ida Tarbell on the pleasures of writing about Lincoln: "Somebody asked her, why do so many people write about Lincoln? And she said, because he's so companionable. And I think somehow that's been true for me."

== Contents ==
The book begins with an introduction where Goodwin explains how she plans to illuminate Lincoln's life: "In my own effort to illuminate the character and career of Abraham Lincoln, I have coupled the account of his life with the stories of the remarkable men who were his rivals for the 1860 Republican presidential nomination—New York senator William H. Seward, Ohio governor Salmon P. Chase, and Missouri's distinguished elder statesman Edward Bates." The book is organized in two parts: Part 1 called "The Rivals" and Part 2 called "Master Among Men". The first part of the book chronicles the rise of Lincoln and each of his political rivals' journeys and how Lincoln ended up with the presidency and ends with the inauguration of Lincoln in 1861. In the second part, Goodwin describes Lincoln's years as President of the Union through the civil war and until his eventual assassination in 1865.

The first chapter of Team of Rivals portrays four major contenders for the 1860 Republican presidential nomination on May 18, 1860, awaiting the results of the national convention by telegraph: New York Senator and former governor William H. Seward, widely considered the frontrunner; Ohio Governor Salmon P. Chase, a favorite of the party's more radical wing; former Missouri Attorney General Edward Bates, preferred by more conservative elements of the party; and Abraham Lincoln, a former U.S. Representative from Illinois. Goodwin then describes how each candidate rose to national political prominence: Seward through a long alliance with New York political boss Thurlow Weed, Chase through his early advocacy of the abolition of slavery, Bates through a speech opposing President James K. Polk at the 1847 River and Harbor Convention, and Lincoln through a series of debates with Democratic rival Stephen A. Douglas in the 1858 Illinois Senate election.

At the Chicago Republican Convention of 1860, Seward was the favorite, as he was the most widely recognized political figure and almost had a majority of pledges. Seward's detractors, who thought that he was too radical on slavery and too liberal on immigration, were worried that if the opposition could not be united behind one man, he would be elected as the candidate - "Murat Halstead of the Cincinnati Commercial telegraphed the same message to his paper at the same time, reporting that "every one of the forty thousand men in attendance upon the Chicago Convention will testify that at midnight of Thursday–Friday night, the universal impression was that Seward's success was certain." However, it was a concern that even if Seward was elected as candidate, he would not be able to carry all the Northern states in the elections because of his abolitionist views against slavery and that would mean a Democratic win in the election.

Similarly, Edward Bates could not represent the middle-line of the Republican Party: "He was much too conservative for liberal Republicans, who might welcome him into their party but would never accord him chief command of an army in which he had never officially enlisted. At the same time, the letter he had written to prove his credentials to the Republicans had diminished the previous enthusiasm of conservatives and former Know Nothings". Salmon Chase's candidacy was hampered by attacks from Ohio politicians like Judge McLean or Benjamin Wade and could not mount a serious challenge. Lincoln emerged as the more palatable choice for these important delegates. Lincoln was ultimately the victor at the 1860 convention through a superior political operation and by making himself the unobjectionable second choice of all Republican factions, and proceeded to win the presidency.

We need the strongest men of the party in the Cabinet. We needed to hold our own people together. I had looked the party over and concluded that these were the very strongest men. Then I had no right to deprive the country of their services.

— Abraham Lincoln

Determined both to hold the party together and to recruit the ablest men for his cabinet, Lincoln then persuaded each of his former rivals to join his cabinet. Seward assumed the post of Secretary of State, Chase that of Secretary of the Treasury, and Bates that of United States Attorney General. The South seceded following Lincoln's election, and the country fell into the American Civil War. Goodwin describes in detail some cabinet decisions, such as the debate over provisioning Fort Sumter in South Carolina, the first state that had seceded (in December 1860), and the issuing of the Emancipation Proclamation, which freed the slaves of secession states. She also traces the home life of the book's main figures, including the marriage of Chase's daughter and close companion Kate, First Lady Mary Todd Lincoln's role in Washington, D.C. society, and the death of Lincoln's son Willie.

During the war, Seward comes to respect and collaborate with Lincoln. Chase, on the other hand, schemes against Lincoln from within the cabinet, hoping to replace him as the Republican nominee in the 1864 presidential election. Lincoln nonetheless keeps Chase in the cabinet until 1864 for his skill at financing the war effort, and his efforts to undermine the president are ultimately unsuccessful. Lincoln also recruits Chase ally Edwin M. Stanton to replace Pennsylvania political boss Simon Cameron as Secretary of War; like Seward, Stanton comes to respect and support Lincoln. While managing the disparate personalities of his cabinet, Lincoln also struggles to manage a series of generals including George B. McClellan, Henry Halleck, and George Meade. The president finally finds success in 1864 by promoting Ulysses S. Grant to commander of the Union armies.

Lincoln oversees the passage of the Thirteenth Amendment to the United States Constitution, which abolishes slavery, and sees the war to its successful conclusion. During the battle for the passage of the Thirteenth Amendment, Lincoln uses all kinds of persuasion and incentives to get the required number of votes for ratification: "I am President of the United States, clothed with great power. The abolition of slavery by constitutional provision settles the fate, for all coming time, not only of the millions now in bondage, but of unborn millions to come—a measure of such importance that those two votes must be procured. I leave it to you to determine how it shall be done; but remember that I am President of the United States, clothed with immense power, and I expect you to procure those votes." He also appoints Chase as the Chief Justice of the US Supreme Court, believing him the best man to secure the rights of newly freed black citizens.

Team of Rivals closes with the assassination of Abraham Lincoln on April 14, 1865. Seward is also attacked by a knife-wielding assailant, though he survives. An epilogue traces the later lives and deaths of Seward, Stanton, Bates, Chase, Mary Lincoln, and others.

== Reception ==
Pulitzer Prize-winning Civil War historian James M. McPherson called it "an elegant, incisive study of Lincoln and leading members of his cabinet that will appeal to experts as well as to those whose knowledge of Lincoln is an amalgam of high school history and popular mythology" and stated that Goodwin addressed Lincoln's gift for coalition-building "better than any other writer". Allen C. Guelzo wrote in The Washington Post that "this immense, finely boned book is no dull administrative or bureaucratic history; rather, it is a story of personalities – a messianic drama, if you will – in which Lincoln must increase and the others must decrease." In the Seattle Times, Kimberly Marlowe Hartnett praised the book's "ambitious, multi-strand structure", concluding, "This monumental effort is a gift; Goodwin's work clarifies and preserves Lincoln's legacy with rare skill." Randy Dotinga of the Christian Science Monitor called Team of Rivals an "immense and immensely readable work". Sanford D. Horwitt of the San Francisco Chronicle wrote that Goodwin is "an engaging, insightful chronicler of Lincoln's Civil War presidency, although she strays from time to time from her stated intention of keeping the lens focused on Lincoln and his 1860 rivals, who, in turn, were often feuding with others in Lincoln's Cabinet."

In 2006, the book was awarded the Lincoln Prize, "awarded annually for the finest scholarly work in English on Abraham Lincoln, the American Civil War soldier, or a subject relating to their era". On March 29, 2006, Goodwin was announced as the winner of the $50,000 Book Prize for American History of the New-York Historical Society. Team of Rivals was also a finalist for the National Book Critics Circle Award and the Los Angeles Times Book Prize.

U.S. President Barack Obama named Team of Rivals as the one book he would want on a desert island. As a senator, he met with Goodwin in Washington to discuss the book. After his election in 2008, Obama reached out to previous rivals including Hillary Clinton, who became his Secretary of State, drawing comparisons to Lincoln's "Team of Rivals" approach.

== Film adaptation ==
While consulting on a project for director Steven Spielberg in 1999, Goodwin told Spielberg she was planning to write Team of Rivals, and Spielberg immediately told her he wanted the film rights. DreamWorks finalized the deal in 2001, and Goodwin sent Spielberg the book chapter by chapter as she composed it. Daniel Day-Lewis agreed to play Abraham Lincoln after Liam Neeson, the original lead, withdrew from the project in 2010. The screenplay was written by Tony Kushner, who was nominated for an Academy Award for Best Writing (Adapted Screenplay). A number of critics noted that the final film, which focused almost entirely on the passage of the Thirteenth Amendment through Congress, was based on only a few pages of Goodwin's book, and that Kushner did substantial independent research composing the screenplay.

Filming began on October 17, 2011, and ended on December 19, 2011. Goodwin consulted with Kushner on various drafts of the screenplay and took Day-Lewis on a tour of Lincoln's home and law office in Springfield, Illinois. The film was released nationwide on November 16, 2012, to commercial success and wide critical acclaim. Day-Lewis won the 2012 Academy Award for Best Actor for his performance.
