= VSA (Kennedy Center) =

US-based non-profit organization

- Type: Nonprofit
- Founded: 1974
- Founder: Jean Kennedy Smith
- Headquarters: Washington, D.C.
- Website: www.kennedy-center.org/education/vsa/

VSA is an international organization on arts, education and disability, which was founded in 1974 by former U.S. Ambassador to Ireland Jean Kennedy Smith, and is headquartered in Washington, DC. In 2011, VSA became the Office of Accessibility and VSA at the John F. Kennedy Center for the Performing Arts. The purpose of VSA – which started out as Very Special Arts – is "to provide people of all ages living with disabilities the opportunity to learn through, participate in and enjoy the arts." A primary focus is on arts education opportunities for young people with disabilities and to "promote the inclusion of people with disabilities in the arts, education and culture around the world." Each year, people of all ages and abilities participate in VSA programs, which cover all artistic genres—music, dance, visual arts, theater and literary arts. This is accomplished through a network of affiliates in 52 countries and VSA state organizations across America.

On 28 September 2005 the Board of Trustees of the Kennedy Center and the Board of Directors of VSA arts – as the organization was known at the time – announced their formal affiliation, effective 3 October 2005. The stated purpose of this action was to "enable both organizations to expand and strengthen their arts education programs to better serve children, families and all people with disabilities around the world." Other reasons cited were to allow for the sharing of resources and programming between the two organizations. The affiliation became a full merger in 2011.

== Principles and philosophy ==
The four principles which guide VSA are that:

- Every young person with a disability deserves access to a high standard of arts learning experiences.
- All artists and art educators, in schools and communities, should be prepared to include students with disabilities in their instruction.
- All children, youth, and adults with disabilities should have complete access to cultural facilities and activities.
- All individuals with disabilities who aspire to have an arts based creative career should have the opportunity to develop their talents and appropriate skills.

Moreover, they state that

Accessibility teaches us that all means all. Everybody. No exceptions. The arts invite people to leave familiar territory, explore new questions, and seek answers. The arts offer a means to expression, communication, and independence. By learning through the arts, children and adults become lifelong learners, experiencing the joy of discovery and exploration, and the value of each other's ideas. VSA is committed to driving change thru the arts – person by person, classroom by classroom, community by community.

== Notable programs ==
Each year Access/VSA sponsors many notable programs such as the VSA Program Sites, International Young Musicians, Playwright Discovery and Emerging Young Artists programs, art exhibitions and performances by emerging and professional performers. Additionally, there are numerous internships and apprenticeships offered at the Kennedy Center and across the nation for those aspiring to achieve a creative career.

VSA founder Jean Kennedy Smith co-authored a book with George Plimpton entitled Chronicles of Courage: Very Special Artists which was published by Random House in April 1993. This 272-page book profiled 16 artists with disabilities who discussed how participation in the arts made a positive difference in their lives.

== Notable artists ==
Many artists of note have been directly involved with, or supportive of, VSA. Those with disabilities have included deaf singer/songwriter Mandy Harvey, painter Chuck Close, sculptor Mark Di Suvero, theatrical director Jack Hofsiss, musician Tony Meléndez, actor and director Howie Seago, glass artist Dale Chihuly, violinist Itzhak Perlman and many others. Academy Award-winning actress Marlee Matlin wrote and published a sequel to her novel Deaf Child Crossing, entitled Nobody's Perfect, which was produced on stage at the Kennedy Center in partnership with VSA arts in October 2007.

== Name changes ==
VSA and its name have evolved since the organization was founded. The organization was and continues to be a pioneer in the field of arts and disability. VSA has played a significant role over the years in changing society's attitudes toward people with disabilities. With that change, the organization has regularly looked at its own identity to ensure it is consistent with current attitudes and language used by the disability community. The organization began in 1974 as National Committee - Arts for the Handicapped, then in 1985 became Very Special Arts. This changed to VSA arts in 1999, and simply VSA in 2009.

Two years later, in 2011, VSA and the Kennedy Center's Office on Accessibility merged, becoming the Department of VSA and Accessibility at the John F. Kennedy Center for the Performing Arts.
