= Randy Souders =

American painter

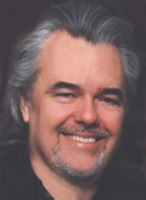
- Born: November 8, 1954 (age 71); Chickasha, Oklahoma
- Education: University of Texas at Arlington
- Known for: Painting

Randy Souders is an American artist and a disability rights advocate.

== Early life and influences ==
Souders was born in Chickasha, Oklahoma. Hoping to become an illustrator he attended Trimble Technical High School in Fort Worth where he received daily instruction in commercial art. At age 14, his parents also enrolled him in a home study correspondence course offered by Art Instruction Schools which was founded in 1914 and well known for its "Draw Me" art introductory tests. He attended the University of Texas at Arlington where he received a Bachelor of Fine Arts degree in graphic design.

On August 5, 1972, three months before his 18th birthday, Souders dove into a local lake and hit a submerged object. He broke his neck and sustained a paralyzing spinal cord injury resulting in incomplete tetraplegia. He adapted and gradually regained enough function to write, paint and live independently. His drawing hand is paralyzed so his artworks are created entirely with wrist and arm movement.

== Career ==
=== Beginning ===
Upon graduating college in May 1978, Souders was employed for a short time at a local advertising agency. He had his first one-man show of paintings on November 8, 1978. Based on the success of this first show, he left advertising to concentrate on painting full-time.

Many millions of Texans had a piece of Souders art in their home and or office when Southwestern Bell selected a painting called "County Seat" for the cover of the 1984–1985 phone book in Houston, San Antonio, Dallas and Fort Worth. The painting featured a red stone courthouse typical of many historic Texas courthouses.

=== Partnerships ===
Since 1990 Souders has created artworks for the Walt Disney Company. Souders' involvement with Disney originally began through his exhibits at the former "Old World Antiques" shop in Liberty Square at Walt Disney World's Magic Kingdom. For ten years he was a featured limited edition artist at each of Disney's "Official Disneyana Conventions".

== Exhibitions ==
- U.S. Embassy -Dublin, Ireland
- 200th Anniversary of Washington as the U.S. Capitol Exhibition

== Charitable affiliations and advocacy ==
Souders was a co-founder and committee member of "Call to Rise", which was billed as the first national fine art exhibition for people with disabilities. Jurors included J. Carter Brown, director of the National Gallery of Art, Barbara Haskell, curator of the Whitney Museum of American Art, and contemporary artist Frank Stella. It opened on January 8, 1988, at the Orlando Museum of Art in Florida."

It was at the opening that Souders first met Jean Kennedy Smith, the youngest sister of President John F. Kennedy. Not long after, she asked him to serve on the national board of directors of VSA Arts, which she founded in 1974. Formerly known as Very Special Arts, VSA is the international organization on arts and disability program of the John F. Kennedy Center for the Performing Arts that annually serves 7 million people across America and in 52 countries. Ambassador Smith dedicated a chapter to Souders in her book Chronicles of Courage: Very Special Artists co-authored by George Plimpton and published by Random House. Souders is also profiled in VSA's 25th anniversary book Journey To Here. He also served on the executive editorial committee and penned the introduction to the book Putting Creativity to Work: Careers in the Arts for People With Disabilities. On June 25, 2020, Souders was invited to speak during a live streamed memorial tribute for Ambassador Smith along with former President Bill Clinton, Senator Chris Dodd, Gerry Adams and members of the Kennedy family.

== Archives ==
Souders's student history and career archives are preserved by the University of Texas at Arlington's library as part of their Texas Disability History Collection.
