= Seago =

Seago is a surname. Notable people with the surname include:

- Edward Seago (1910–1974), English artist
- Howie Seago (born 1953), American actor and director

== See also ==
- Seagoville, Texas
