= Leadership in Turbulent Times =

2018 book by Doris Kearns Goodwin

- First edition
- Author: Doris Kearns Goodwin
- Genre: History
- Publisher: Simon & Schuster
- Publication date: 2018
- Publication place: United States
- Media type: Book
- Pages: 478
- ISBN: 978-1-4767-9592-8
- Preceded by: The Bully Pulpit (book)

Leadership in Turbulent Times is a 2018 book by Doris Kearns Goodwin and was published by Simon & Schuster. The book covers the lives and leadership skills of four US Presidents Goodwin previously studied: Abraham Lincoln, Theodore Roosevelt, Franklin D. Roosevelt, and Lyndon B. Johnson.

Divided into three sections, the first section covers the early lives and political rise of the leaders. The second part describes setbacks. The final section studies an executive action for each president that demonstrates leadership. As Goodwin's eighth book, Leadership in Turbulent Times was released in 2018 and received positive reviews for its readability, research, and accessibility, whereas multiple reviewers criticized the book's final section.

== Background ==
Leadership in Turbulent Times is Goodwin's eighth book. She previously published The Bully Pulpit in 2013, which was a biographical book on the relationship of Theodore Roosevelt and William Howard Taft. She worked on the book for five years.

== Contents ==
The book opens with an introduction in which Goodwin covers the leadership traits and historical assessments of the four presidents. The book is subsequently divided into three sections. The first section, labeled "Ambition and the Recognition of Leadership", covers the early lives and political rises of the four presidents. The second describes the "dramatic reversals that shattered the private and public lives of all four men". Lastly, the third section covers aspects of their presidencies at the White House, which Goodwin described as when they were "at their formidable best".

=== First section ===
In the first section, Goodwin described the early lives of each president and compared Lincoln's experiences of poverty with the upbringing of Theodore Roosevelt and Franklin D. Roosevelt, who were born to wealthy families and studied at Harvard University. Goodwin also examined the relationships of the future presidents with their parents and their roles in their evolving leadership traits, including Johnson identifying "with his father's political ambitions" in his early life.

=== Second section ===
Part two covers setbacks to the future presidents, including a depression between Lincoln and Johnson, with the former failing his engagement with Mary Todd and political troubles, whereas Johnson was unsuccessful in his attempted run to the Senate seat. In contrast, Theodore Roosevelt underwent “grand tragedy" after the deaths of his mother and wife, whereas Franklin D. Roosevelt experienced a life-threatening polio case. However, the leaders subsequently recovered from the setbacks and worked in various jobs, such as Theodore Roosevelt's roles as a civil service commissioner, police commissioner, lieutenant colonel, governor, and vice president as well as Lyndon B. Johnson's experiences as a senator and leader of the senate. Goodwin then covers leadership skills the future presidents gained from the setbacks and experiences.

=== Final section ===
In the final section, Goodwin explains the leadership skills of the presidents demonstrated by various actions, including Lincoln's signing of the Emancipation Proclamation that freed slaves; Theodore Roosevelt's handling of the Coal Strike of 1902 and facilitating an end to the conflicts between nine mine owners and labor workers; Franklin Roosevelt's signing of New Deal projects, including the Civilian Conservation Corps, projects for the Works Progress Administration, and the introduction of businesses through the Securities and Exchange Commission; and Lyndon B. Johnson's signings of the 1964 Civil Rights Act, Voting Rights Act of 1965, the Elementary and Secondary Education Act, and Medicare, forming the Great Society. However, Goodwin criticized Johnson's handling of the Vietnam War, including escalation of tensions, "manipulating the budget", and concealing of information from the public.

The book ends with an epilogue covering the post-presidencies and deaths of the four presidents.

== Reception ==
The reviewer Sara Jorgensen praised its relevancy and prose in a Booklist review. Publishers Weekly awarded a starred review, praising the "inspirational" tone and coverage of criticism on the presidents. Kirkus also awarded a starred review, considering the book to be "intimate" and "knowing", and praised the engagement as well as the "astute psychological portraits". Frank Williams from Civil War Book Review also praised the section describing the presidents' handling of the four crises.

Matt Damsker from USA Today described the book as "peerless" and praised the research, structure, and "succinct lessons in leadership under pressure". Brian Matthew Jordan from The New York Journal of Books also described it as "thoughtful and timely". This was shared by David Shribman from Boston Globe, who praised its readability and "celebration of leadership" but highlighted that "the strongest compliment" was its timeliness. Tom Keogh, from the Seattle Times, gave a positive review, calling it "engrossing". Writing for The Washington Post, Virginia senator Tim Kaine praised the engagement and Goodwin's descriptions that "leaders truly are made, not born", but said that "the distilled nature of 'Leadership' also obscures one of Goodwin's tremendous strengths" of examining the relationships of leaders.

This sentiment was shared by David Greenberg, who reviewed the book in The New York Times. He praised the "companionable prose", coverage of the "variety and peculiarities", and the accounts of Franklin D. Roosevelt demonstrating complexity. However, Greenberg criticized the boldfaced snippets between paragraphs and described them as "interrupting the flow of the stories while unfurling what are fairly self-evident, common-sense all streamers of advice". Scott Detrow gave a similar assessment in an NPR review, praising the "focused and purposeful" writing, but also was negative towards the bolded snippets. He concluded that Goodwin "succeeds", but considered the latter chapters to be less interesting than the early ones. In contrast, Mathew Toland from Journal of the Illinois State Historical Society complimented the final section, though stated that he would prefer another chapter that compares shared and contrasting traits of the leaders.

Danny Heitman from the Christian Science Monitor, in a mixed review, was complimentary of the lack of partisanship, but critiqued that it was "repackaged to accommodate the present fad in leadership tutorials" compared to her previous books. Philip Delves Broughton from The Wall Street Journal gave a negative review and praised the readability, but critiqued the generalization, lack of detail, and the snippets, which he called as being "headings ripped from the Harvard Business Review".
