= Barbara Gordon (disambiguation) =

Barbara Gordon may refer to:

- Barbara Gordon, a fictional character appearing in DC Comics
- Barbara Gordon (filmmaker) (1935–2026), American documentary filmmaker and author
- Barbara Gordon (actress), Canadian actress
