= Green B. Trimble Technical High School =

Public school in Texas, United States

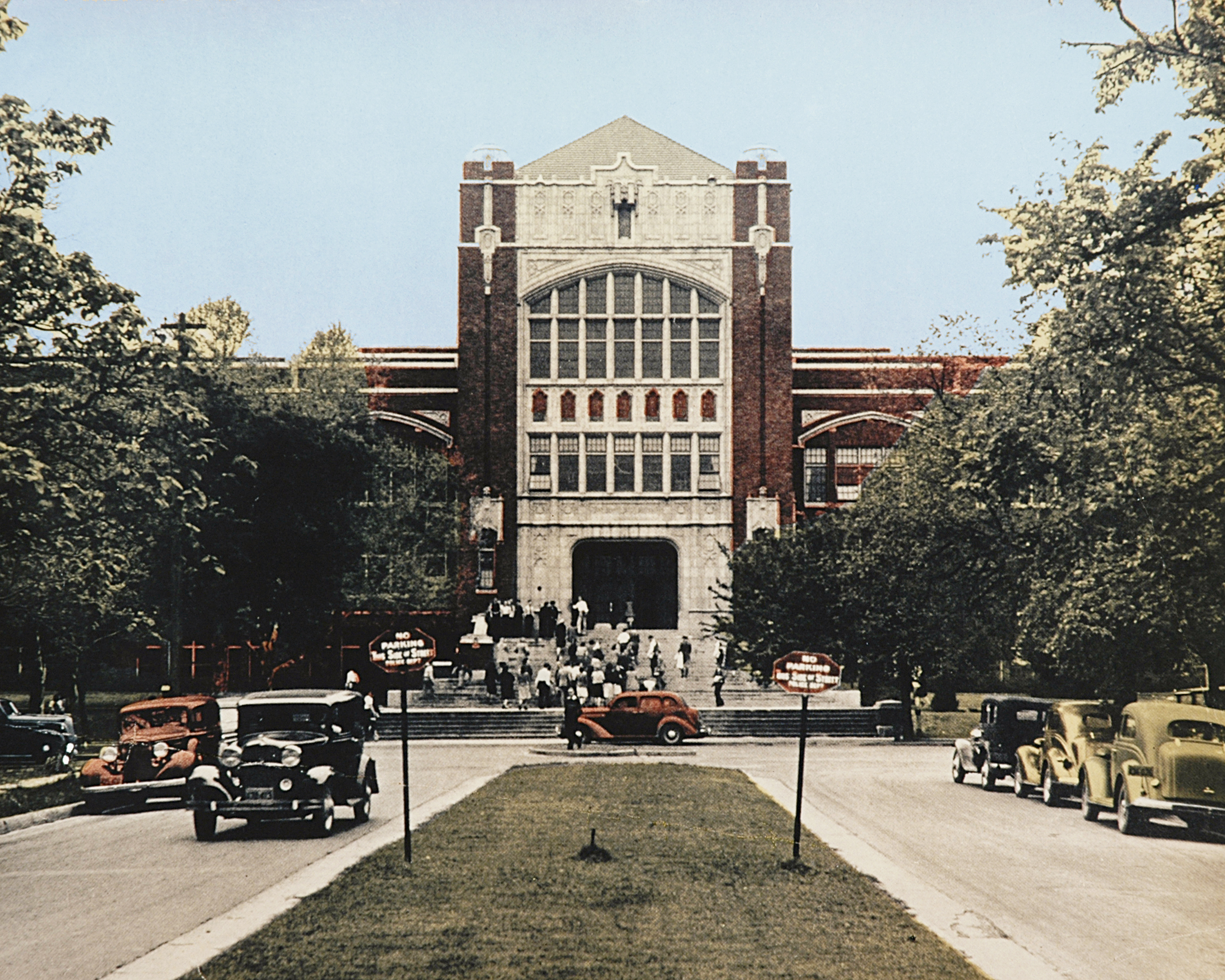
- An undated photo looking south at Trimble Tech from South Adams Street

Location
- 1003 W. Cannon St. Fort Worth, Texas 76104; United States; 32°44′10″N 97°20′10″W

Information
- Type: Public vocational high school
- Established: 1955 (as Fort Worth Technical High School); 1882 (as Fort Worth High School)
- School district: Fort Worth Independent School District
- Superintendent: Dr. Karen Molinar
- CEEB code: 442570
- Principal: Jose Angel Lara
- Grades: 9-12
- Enrollment: 1,841 (January 2025)
  - Grade 9: 526
  - Grade 10: 512
  - Grade 11: 396
  - Grade 12: 407
- Campus type: Urban
- Colors: Green and White
- Nickname: Bulldogs
- Rival: Arlington Heights High School
- Newspaper: Tech Tribune
- Yearbook: The Bulldog
- Website: Trimble Tech High School

Green B. Trimble Technical High School (commonly known as Trimble Tech) is a Fort Worth Independent School District vocational high school on the south side of Fort Worth, Texas, United States, in the medical district.

== History ==
=== Fort Worth High School (1882–1918) ===
Green B. Trimble Technical High School started in 1882 as Fort Worth High School. In 1910, the school's original building burned to the ground, forcing classes to move to elementary schools. The new Fort Worth High School building opened in 1911 on the corner of Jennings and Rosedale avenues in southwest Fort Worth. That building is now an apartment complex called Parker Commons.

In 1917, Bryce Building and Wyatt C. Hendrick Construction companies began construction on the building that now houses Trimble Tech. It was designed to resemble the original Fort Worth High School building that had been destroyed by fire.

=== Central High School (1918–1935) ===
Fort Worth High School was renamed Central High School in 1918, just after moving to its current location. The school proved popular among Fort Worth students, prompting an expansion that included an auditorium and gymnasium.

=== R. L. Paschal High School (1935–1955) ===
In 1935, Central High School was renamed after longtime principal R.L. Paschal, who retired that year after 29 years of service. R.L. Paschal High School still exists in the Fort Worth Independent School District, but it relocated in 1955 to the corner of Berry Street and Forest Park Boulevard, near Texas Christian University.

=== Fort Worth Technical High School (1955–1967) ===
After the relocation of Paschal High School in 1955, the building was named Fort Worth Technical High School. The school saw a period of expansion during the next 12 years. In 1964, An increase in the size of the student body prompted the 1967 construction of a new academic wing on the east side of the building.

=== Green B. Trimble Technical High School (1967–present) ===
In 1967, the school was once again renamed, this time to Green B. Trimble Technical High School, upon the retirement of the principal who started the vocational aspect of the school. The school continued to expand. In 1972, a field house and athletic facilities were built on what was formerly Humbolt Street, south of the main building. A new gymnasium was added behind the main building in 1980. A 1998 bond referendum made it possible for Trimble Tech to add a new band hall, technology wing, cafeteria and library. The field house and athletic fields were also replaced.

== Campus ==
Trimble Tech sits about two miles (3 km) south of downtown Fort Worth, in a district called the Near Southside. The 15-acre (61,000 m^{2}) campus is bound by West Cannon Street to the north, West Dashwood Street to the south, South Henderson Street to the west and College Avenue to the east.

The campus consists of the main building, an outside gymnasium and band hall and a field house. Outdoor athletic facilities include a running track, football practice field, tennis courts, a baseball field and a softball field.

== Student body ==
Although Trimble Tech's enrollment varies from year to year, it generally maintains just under 2,000 students. It had 1,923 students during the 2026-2027 school year, of whom 86.1 percent were Hispanic, 9.8 percent were African American, 1.6 percent were White, 0.9 percent were Asian or Pacific Islanders and 0.1 percent were Native American.

It was reported that 86.5 percent of Trimble Tech's students were economically disadvantaged in the 2026 - 2027 school year.

== Academics ==
Trimble Tech is a vocational school. In addition to Texas-mandated curriculum requirements, Tech's students take classes that prepare them for various technical and career fields, such as carpentry, auto repair and a special-interest program called health science and hospital administration.

In July 2010, Trimble Tech attained "Recognized" status based on its students' performance on state-mandated Texas Assessment of Knowledge and Skills standardized tests. The school was awarded the ACT College Readiness Award in 2010, 2011 and 2012.

== Extracurricular activities ==
Trimble Tech is a member of Conference 5A, Region 1, District 7 of the University Interscholastic League for all sports except wrestling. Wrestling competes in Region 2, District 6.

Students at Trimble Tech compete in boys' and girls' basketball, boys' and girls' soccer, boys' baseball, girls' softball, girls' volleyball, boys' and girls' track, boys' and girls' cross country, wrestling and tennis.

Tech students also participate in orchestra, band, choir and drama programs, as well as various cultural and academic organizations, such as anime club and Link Crew.

== Feeder patterns ==
Unlike other high schools in the Fort Worth Independent School District, Trimble Tech does not follow traditional feeder patterns. Eighth-grade students from schools in and out of the district must apply for acceptance into Trimble Tech.

== Notable alumni ==
- Dionne Anglin — news anchor with KDFW
- Paulie Ayala — boxer, 1995 bantamweight title
- Candy Clark — actress
- Raymond Clayborn — NFL football player
- Steve Cruz — boxer, 1986 WBA Featherweight title
- Deborah Ferguson — news anchor with NBC 5 News
- Henry Ford — NFL football player, 1994-2002 Tennessee titans
- Yovani Gallardo — Major League Baseball player
- Ben Hogan — golfer
- Windell Middlebrooks— actor
- Ginger Rogers — actress, dancer, singer
- Randy Souders — artist
- Neha Mahajan — actress
