= Tony Meléndez =

American singer

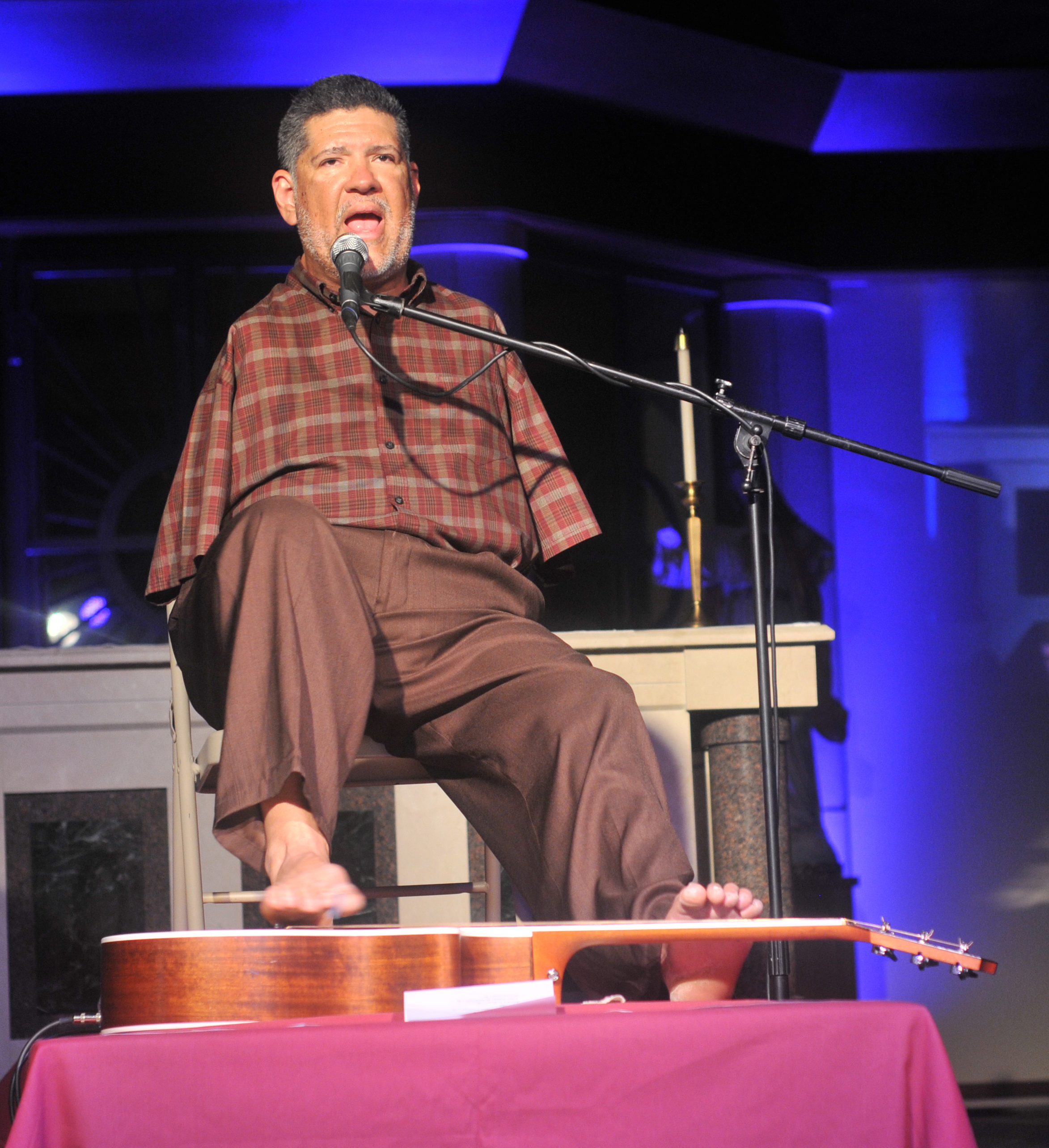
- Meléndez performing on March 6, 2015

Background information
- Born: José Antonio Meléndez Rodríguez; January 9, 1962 (age 64); Rivas, Nicaragua
- Genres: Christian, Spanish
- Occupations: Singer; songwriter; composer
- Instrument: guitar
- Years active: 1985–present
- Website: tonymelendez.com

José Antonio Meléndez Rodríguez (born January 9, 1962) is a Nicaraguan-American guitar player, composer, singer, and songwriter who was born without arms. His mother took thalidomide while pregnant, which caused his disability. Meléndez has learned to play the guitar with his feet.

== Career ==
Meléndez began playing and singing in the Los Angeles area in 1985. On September 15, 1987, Meléndez sang Never Be the Same while playing the guitar with his feet in a special performance for Pope John Paul II. Visibly moved, the Pope descended from his chair and embraced Meléndez. The Pope told Meléndez, "My wish to you, is to continue of giving [sic] this hope to all, all the people," which inspired him.

His band, Tony Meléndez and the Toe Jam Band, has a busy concert schedule. Meléndez gives motivational talks and has written a book. He campaigns actively for the anti-abortion cause.

Meléndez now resides in Branson, Missouri with his wife, Lynn.

== Awards and recognition ==
Meléndez has won Unity Awards Male Vocalist of the Year UCMVA in 2000, 2002, and 2004, and. In 2002, he took Artist of the year. He received the Branson Entertainment Award for Best New Artist in 1999, the "Inspirational Hero Award from the NFL Alumni Association at the Super Bowl XXIII and has received special commendations from the State of California for his work with young people and from President Reagan, regarding Tony "as a positive role model for America".

Meléndez spoke candidly about the effect disability had on his life and work in the book Chronicles of Courage: Very Special Artists written by Jean Kennedy Smith and George Plimpton and published by Random House.

- Special Commendation from President Reagan — As A Positive Role Model for America
- Special Commendation from State of California - For Work with Young People
- Inspirational Hero Award from the NFL Alumni Association at Super Bowl XXIII in Miami
- Branson Entertainment Awards – Best New Artist (1999)
- Unity Awards — Male Vocalist of the Year UCMVA (2000)
- Unity Awards — Artist of the Year UCMVA (2002)
- Unity Awards — Male Vocalist of the Year UCMVA (2002)
- Unity Awards — Male Vocalist of the Year UCMVA (2004)

== Discography ==
- Never be the Same (1988)
- Ways of the Wise (1990)
- El Muro Se Callo (1991)
- Debe Haber (1995)
- Hands in Heaven (1997)
- The Cup of Life (1998)
- Intimate Worship (1999)

== Published works ==
- A Gift of Hope (1991)

== See also ==
- Mark Goffeney
- Marty Ravellette
