= I'm Dancing as Fast as I Can =

1982 film by Jack Hofsiss

- Directed by: Jack Hofsiss
- Written by: David Rabe
- Based on: I'm Dancing As Fast As I Can; 1979 book by Barbara Gordon
- Produced by: Scott Rudin; Edgar J. Scherick
- Starring: Jill Clayburgh; Nicol Williamson; Geraldine Page; Dianne Wiest; Joe Pesci; Daniel Stern
- Cinematography: Jan de Bont
- Edited by: Michael Bradsell
- Music by: Stanley Silverman
- Distributed by: Paramount Pictures
- Release date: March 5, 1982
- Running time: 106 minutes
- Country: United States
- Language: English
- Budget: $4-5 million
- Box office: $291,390

I'm Dancing as Fast as I Can is a 1982 American biographical film directed by Jack Hofsiss and starring Jill Clayburgh. The screenplay by David Rabe is based on the memoir of the same title by Emmy Award-winning documentary filmmaker Barbara Gordon, whose addiction to and difficult withdrawal from Valium serves as the basis of the plot.

== Plot ==
Barbara Gordon appears to have it all, including a successful career as a TV producer and a solid relationship with her live-in lover, attorney Derek Bauer. Beneath her facade is a high-strung personality who heavily relies on sedatives to reduce tension and anxiety and maintain a composed exterior for her friends and associates. Her current project focuses on cancer patient Jean Scott Martin and her husband Ben and how the couple is coping as the disease progresses. Despite reservations expressed by her collaborators, Barbara is determined to end the film on a positive note, showing the Martins embracing on the beach.

When she shows them a rough cut, fatalistic Jean is angered by the false optimism and vehemently voices her objections to Barbara's choices. The response triggers a deep depression in Barbara, who relies on Doctor Kalman, her therapist of many years, and an increased dosage of Valium to see her through the crisis. She finally reaches a turning point when she realizes Kalman's treatment has been ineffective and admits her dependence on drugs is controlling her life. Her effort to quit cold turkey results in a rapid physical, mental, and emotional deterioration fueled by Derek's refusal to let her seek medical help and his alcohol-driven determination to control her completely.

Following a series of physical fights, he imprisons her—bruised, bloodied, and broken—by tying her to a chair. She manages to convince him they had dinner plans with friends Karen and Sam Mulligan, and when he calls them to cancel, her screams for help alert them to her situation. Barbara is institutionalized and begins a long and arduous journey toward recovery with the help of Julie Addison. During this period, she is visited by Jean, who confesses she may have overreacted to Barbara's film and feels a sense of guilt over her breakdown.

Her encouragement inspires Barbara to get well and complete the project. Jean suggests she end the film with an image of Barbara walking on the beach, and she complies with her wishes. Jean dies before seeing the completed work, but a newly confident Barbara is certain she would have approved of it.

== Cast ==
- Jill Clayburgh as Barbara Gordon
- Nicol Williamson as Derek Bauer
- Dianne Wiest as Julie Addison
- Geraldine Page as Jean Scott Martin
- Albert Salmi as Ben Martin
- James Sutorius as Sam Mulligan
- Ellen Greene as Karen Mulligan
- Joseph Maher as Dr. Kalman
- Joe Pesci as Roger
- Richard Hamilton as Joe
- Daniel Stern as Jim
- Dan Hedaya as Dr. Klein
- Kathleen Widdoes as Dr. Rawlings
- Richard Masur as Alan Newman
- John Lithgow as Mr. Brunner
- David Margulies as Walter Kress

== Production ==
Edgar Scherick later said, "Michael Eisner said, 'Let's make the first Valium movie.' I think it is the only Valium movie. I hated the guts of our lead actress Jill Clayburgh. She was cruel to everybody. I hate cruel people. It wasn't a bad book. Jill Clayburgh was Michael Eisner's cousin or something like that. He wanted to make a picture with Jill Clayburg. I never thought much of the picture."

Much of the film was shot on location in New York City. The hospital interiors and exteriors were filmed at Pomona College in Claremont, California.

Some of the original music composed by Stanley Silverman was performed by pianist Paul Jacobs. The soundtrack includes "I Guess I'll Have to Change My Plan" by Tony Bennett and Count Basie and "Our Love Is Insane" by Desmond Child and Rouge.

== Critical response ==
The film received negative reviews during its release. In her review in The New York Times, Janet Maslin called it

a forceful and involving film. But it's not an especially revealing one. We never quite learn why Barbara Gordon, who is played earnestly and vigorously by Jill Clayburgh, has gotten into trouble. Although the film describes her illness and recovery in harrowing detail, it simply presents the symptoms ... I'm Dancing as Fast as I Can is often quite effective, by nature of the very nightmare that it chronicles. But its power is more bluntly disturbing than provocative or controlled. Geraldine Page particularly exemplifies this, in the role of a poet who is dying of cancer ... the film isn't sure how to use her. It returns to her periodically, as if trying not to be forgetful, rather than in a more dramatic or opportune way. It doesn't wonder why Barbara is more deeply attached to this woman than to anyone else in her life. And it chronicles her illness as much for its upsetting effect as to provide any insight into Barbara. This movie doesn't need any more distress than Barbara's story already provides.

According to Variety: "Crucial inability of a film to get inside a character's head spells big trouble for I'm Dancing As Fast As I Can. Result here is that Jill Clayburgh's constantly center-stage character comes off as the pill-popping dingbat she's called at one point, rather than as a fascinating lady with a major problem ... Only two members of the large supporting cast, Dianne Wiest and Geraldine Page, have any chance to develop their characters, and both do well."

I'm Dancing as Fast as I Can holds a 33% rating on Rotten Tomatoes based on six reviews.
