= Stephen Edward Smith =

American businessman and husband of Jean Ann Kennedy

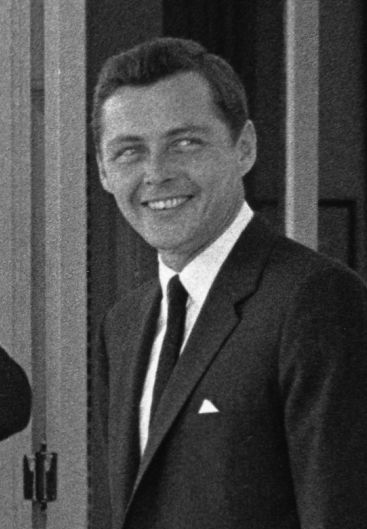
- Smith in 1963

Personal details
- Born: September 24, 1927 Bayport, New York, U.S.
- Died: August 19, 1990 (aged 62) New York City, U.S.
- Spouse: Jean Ann Kennedy (m. 1956)
- Children: 4, including William
- Relatives: Kennedy family
- Education: Georgetown University

Military service
- Allegiance: United States
- Branch/service: United States Air Force
- Years of service: 1951–1952
- Rank: First lieutenant
- Battles/wars: Korean War

Stephen Edward Smith (September 24, 1927 – August 19, 1990) was a financial analyst and political strategist for the 1960 United States presidential campaign of his brother-in-law John F. Kennedy.

== Early life ==
Smith was born in Bayport, Long Island, New York, to John Joseph Smith and Julia A. (Cleary), daughter of four-term Congressman William E. Cleary, and grew up in the Bay Ridge section of Brooklyn. He attended Georgetown University, graduating in 1948 with a bachelor's degree in history. He served during the Korean War as a first lieutenant in the U.S. Air Force from 1951–1952.

== Career ==
Smith worked for his family's business, Cleary Brothers Inc., which operated tugs and barges on New York's upstate canals and in New York Harbor. He then headed the Park Agency Inc., in Manhattan, where he managed $300 million worth of Kennedy family investments.

After his father-in-law Joseph P. Kennedy Sr. suffered a stroke on December 19, 1961, Smith, still working in Manhattan, managed the family's fortune. He was responsible for overseeing the trusts that benefited him and his family as well as the other children and grandchildren of Joseph and Rose Kennedy.

=== Kennedy campaigns ===
Smith had an active role in JFK's 1960 presidential campaign, and was working as Kennedy's campaign manager for re-election in 1964 at the time when President Kennedy was assassinated in Dallas, Texas on November 22, 1963. Smith served as United States Senator Robert F. Kennedy's campaign manager during his 1968 presidential run at the time when the Senator was assassinated at the Ambassador Hotel in Los Angeles, California on June 5, 1968. During the autumn of 1979, as polls indicated that Senator Ted Kennedy could easily defeat President Jimmy Carter in the Democratic primaries, Kennedy announced his candidacy and made Smith his campaign manager. Kennedy lost to Carter and chose not to campaign again.

== Personal life ==
Smith and Jean Ann Kennedy were married May 19, 1956, in St. Patrick's Cathedral in Midtown Manhattan, at which time he became the brother-in-law of future President John F. Kennedy. Stephen and Jean had two biological sons and later adopted two daughters:

- Stephen Edward Smith Jr. (b. 1957)
- William Kennedy Smith (b. 1960)
- Amanda Mary Smith (b. 1967)
- Kym Maria Smith (b. 1972)

== Illness and death ==
A longtime smoker, Smith died from lung cancer at his home in Manhattan on August 19, 1990, at age 62.
