= Loud as a Whisper =

- Star Trek: The Next Generation episode
- Episode no.: Season 2 Episode 5
- Directed by: Larry Shaw
- Written by: Jacqueline Zambrano
- Cinematography by: Edward R. Brown
- Production code: 132
- Original air date: January 9, 1989

Guest appearances
- Howie Seago – Riva; Marnie Mosiman – Riva's Chorus; Thomas Oglesby – Riva's Chorus; Leo Damian – Riva's Chorus; Colm Meaney - O'Brien; Richard Lavin - Warrior #1; Chip Heller - Warrior #2; John Garrett - Lieutenant

Episode chronology
← Previous "The Outrageous Okona"	Next → "The Schizoid Man"
- Star Trek: The Next Generation season 2

"Loud as a Whisper" is the fifth episode of the second season of the American science fiction television series Star Trek: The Next Generation, the 31st episode overall which first broadcast on January 9, 1989.

Set in the 24th century, the series follows the adventures of the Starfleet crew of the Federation starship Enterprise-D. In this episode, the Enterprise ferries a deaf ambassador (Howie Seago) who leads difficult peace talks.

== Plot ==
The Federation starship Enterprise, commanded by Captain Jean-Luc Picard (Patrick Stewart), is set to take aboard Riva (Howie Seago), a renowned negotiator, to help resolve a centuries-old war between two tribes on planet Solais V. Riva is deaf due to a hereditary lack of the gene for hearing in the royal family. He uses sign language and lip reading but travels with a "chorus" (Marnie Mosiman, Thomas Oglesby, and Leo Damian), an entourage in telepathic communication with him, who are able to enunciate his thoughts. Riva dismisses the Enterprise crew's briefing on the history of the conflict, explaining that the dispute has long since become personal, regardless of the tangible concerns that may have started it. When Riva, his chorus and several Enterprise officers beam down for the meeting, one tribal delegate fires upon them, killing the chorus. The tribe's leader immediately brands him a traitor and executes him, begging for the talks to continue but the away team has already begun emergency transport back to the Enterprise amid the chaos.

Riva, frustrated and agitated, struggles to communicate with the crew, so Picard orders Commander Data (Brent Spiner) to find and learn Riva's sign language and act as translator. Picard offers to take Riva's place at the mediation but Riva believes the Solaian tribes will only cooperate with him. Riva is prepared to abandon the peace process and return to his home planet, accepting his failure but Counselor Troi (Marina Sirtis) inspires him to stay, suggesting that he turn his disadvantage into an advantage, recalling Riva's negotiating tactic. Riva returns to the meeting spot on the planet and to the crew's surprise, tells them that they should leave and that he will signal Starfleet when the negotiations are complete, as they may take several months. For the tribes to work with Riva, they will have to learn sign language from Riva, which will create a shared experience between them. Thus, Riva is turning his disadvantage of being unable to communicate into an advantage. The crew leaves Riva to await the tribe representatives.

== Production ==
Howie Seago, who is deaf, approached the show's producers with the idea of a deaf mediator. The initial idea came from his wife, who is a fan of Star Trek. The writers originally wanted Seago's character to learn to speak after his chorus is killed, but Seago was opposed to the idea, as it could perpetuate the practice of forcing deaf children to speak. The producers were understanding of his concerns and wrote a new draft.

== Reception ==
Zack Handlen of The A.V. Club rated the episode B− and wrote that the episode is "often painfully earnest in its philosophical meanderings, and it's nearly impossible to watch without snickering in places, but it's also thoughtful, sincere, and, if you can stop rolling your eyes long enough, inspiring." Tor.com gave it 4 out of 10.
