= Barbara Gordon (filmmaker) =

American filmmaker (1935–2026)

- Born: Barbara Sue Loeb; December 19, 1935; Miami Beach, Florida, U.S.
- Died: April 7, 2026 (aged 90); New York City, U.S.
- Occupations: Documentary filmmaker; writer

Barbara Sue Gordon (née Loeb; December 19, 1935 – April 7, 2026) was an American documentary filmmaker and author. She worked on the Emmy Award-winning PBS series The Great American Dream Machine, where she filmed segments on Studs Terkel, Dalton Trumbo, and Jane Fonda. After graduating from Barnard College, she worked for almost 20 years in television as a writer and producer. In 1979, Gordon published her memoir I'm Dancing as Fast as I Can, which follows her addiction to Valium and battle toward recovery. A film adaptation, directed by Jack Hofsiss and starring Jill Clayburgh as Gordon, was released in 1982.

== Career ==
After graduating from Barnard College in 1956, Gordon got a job as a secretary in the public relations department at NBC. She worked her way up through the company, eventually becoming a researcher, then a production assistant.

Gordon worked on The Today Show until the late 1960s when she left and went to work for National Educational Television, where she co-produced documentaries.

Gordon worked for a CBS affiliate, WCBS, in New York and won two Emmys for her work on the Channel 2 series Eye On. She produced documentaries on topics spanning from retirement fraud in the volunteer army to the rights of mental health patients to live in communities where they were not welcome.

== Personal life and death ==
Gordon was born in Miami Beach, Florida, on December 19, 1935. During 1976, Gordon suffered from an addiction to Valium. She later wrote about her experiences and recovery in her memoir I'm dancing as fast as I can, released in 1979.

In 1961, she married Myron Gordon, but later divorced. They had no children. Barbara Gordon died in Manhattan, New York, on April 7, 2026, at the age of 90.

== Publications ==
- I’m dancing as fast as I can - Memoir (1979) LCCN 78-20165
- Defects of the Heart. Novel (1983) LCCN 82-48144
- Jennifer Fever. Nonfiction. Harper Collins (1988) LCCN 87-46140
