= William Kennedy Smith =

American physician and businessman (born 1960)

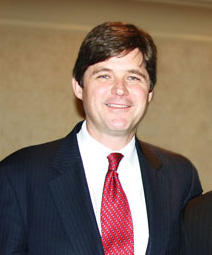
- Smith in 2008

Commissioner of the District of Columbia from district 2A04
- In office January 2, 2015 – August 30, 2020
- Preceded by: Armando Irizarry
- Succeeded by: Donna Feigley Barbisch

Personal details
- Born: September 4, 1960 (age 66) Boston, Massachusetts, U.S.
- Spouse: Anne Henry (m. 2011)
- Children: 3
- Parents: Stephen Edward Smith; Jean Ann Kennedy
- Education: Duke University; Georgetown University School of Medicine (M.D.)
- Occupation: Physician

William Kennedy Smith (born September 4, 1960) is an American physician and a member of the Kennedy family who founded an organization focused on land mines and the rehabilitation of landmine victims. He is known for being charged with rape in a nationally publicized 1991 trial that ended with his acquittal.

== Early life, family, and education ==
Born in Boston, William Kennedy Smith is the younger son of Stephen Edward Smith and Jean Kennedy Smith. His mother was the youngest daughter of Joseph P. Kennedy Sr. and Rose Fitzgerald Kennedy. He is a nephew of President John F. Kennedy, Senator and Attorney General Robert F. Kennedy, and Senator Ted Kennedy. Smith has an elder brother, Stephen Edward Smith Jr., and two adopted sisters, Kym and Amanda Smith.

He attended boarding school at Salisbury School in Salisbury, Connecticut. He received his undergraduate degree from Duke University; completed premedical post-baccalaureate studies at Bryn Mawr College; and, in 1991, received his M.D. degree from Georgetown University School of Medicine.

== Personal life ==
Smith married Anne Henry, an arts fundraising consultant, on May 12, 2011, at Tilghman Island, Maryland. They have three children.

=== Legal accusations ===
==== 1991 sexual assault charge ====
On December 12, 1991, Smith was acquitted of rape at a trial that attracted extensive media coverage.

The alleged incident occurred on the evening of Good Friday, March 29, 1991, when Smith was at Au Bar in Palm Beach, Florida with his uncle, Senator Ted Kennedy, and his cousin, Patrick J. Kennedy. There, Smith met Patricia Bowman and two other women. According to police, Smith asked Bowman for a ride back to a nearby house owned by the Kennedy family; Smith and Bowman then walked along the beach. Bowman told police that Smith then violently raped her. At about 4:00 am, she called two friends who retrieved her from the Kennedy compound and took her first to their home and then to her own home, where Bowman called a rape crisis center.

A few hours later, Bowman reported the incident to the police and was taken to a hospital for a rape kit examination, which documented semen in her vagina, complaints of severe pain, and bruising. At trial, Smith said that he and Bowman had engaged in sex, but that the sex had been consensual. Although three other women were willing to testify that Smith had sexually assaulted them in incidents in the 1980s that were not reported to the police, their testimony was excluded on the grounds that the pattern of behavior reported was not similar enough in its details to the Bowman case. When Bowman testified, her face was hidden by a large blue dot—leading to her being termed "the Blue Dot Woman" by a few journalists—but she chose to go public with her identity later.

Smith was acquitted of all charges. It took the jury less than 75 minutes to reach a not guilty verdict.

==== 2004 lawsuit ====
In 2004, a former employee of the Center for International Rehabilitation (CIR) alleged that Smith had sexually assaulted her in 1999, and sued him. Smith denied her charges, calling them "outrageous" and saying that "family and personal history have made me unusually vulnerable to these kinds of charges". Smith later resigned from the CIR.

A spokesman for the organization later acknowledged that two separate federal sexual harassment claims against Smith, by former female employees of CIR, had been "settled amicably". On January 5, 2005, the court dismissed the employee's lawsuit.

== Career and community involvement ==
Smith is the founder of Physicians Against Land Mines, a Chicago-based organization that advocates for an end to the use of land mines and assists persons injured by land mines. He also founded the Center for International Rehabilitation (CIR) in 1996. As of 2001, Smith was an adjunct instructor at Northwestern University Medical School and the Rehabilitation Institute of Chicago. Smith considered running for Congress in the 2002 elections in Illinois, but ultimately decided against it.

As of 2011, Smith worked at MedRed, a Washington-based medical communications technology firm.

In 2014, Smith was elected to the Foggy Bottom Advisory Neighborhood Commission in Washington D.C.
