= Chronicles of Courage: Very Special Artists =

- Cover of the first edition.
- Author: Jean Kennedy Smith & George Plimpton
- Language: English
- Genre: Biography
- Published: April 6, 1993 Random House
- Publication place: United States
- Media type: Print (hardback & paperback)
- Pages: 234 (272 paperback)
- ISBN: 9780679782988
- Website: http://www.randomhouse.com

Chronicles of Courage: Very Special Artists was written by Ambassador Jean Kennedy Smith with George Plimpton (co-founder of the Paris Review) and published by Random House in April 1993. In 1974, Smith founded Very Special Arts, an educational affiliate of the Kennedy Center that provides opportunities in the creative arts for persons with disabilities in the United States and around the world. In February 2011, President Obama awarded her the Presidential Medal of Freedom, the nation's highest civilian honor, for her work with people with disabilities.

The 272 page book profiles 16 artists with disabilities who discuss how art has made a difference in their lives despite their unique challenges. Artists include Pamela Spurlock Boggess, Chuck Close, George Covington, Joseph Dawley and Gloria Dawley, Mark di Suvero, Elaine Greco, Donald Greco, and Karen Greco, Jack Hofsiss, and Maureen Laffey, Tony Meléndez, Michael Naranjo and Laurie Naranjo, Mary Pearce and Bryan Pearce, Audrey Penn, Reynolds Price, Howie Seago and Lori Seago, Alison Sheen, Randy Souders, Lauren Summers and Earl Shoop, and Mary Verdi-Fletcher. The book also includes a "disability awareness guide," a list of disability organizations and other resources. It was published in both hardcover and paperback editions.
