= Rosemary Kennedy =

Sister of John F. Kennedy (1918–2005)

- Kennedy in 1938
- Born: Rose Marie Kennedy; September 13, 1918; Brookline, Massachusetts, U.S.
- Died: January 7, 2005 (aged 86); Fort Atkinson, Wisconsin, U.S.
- Burial place: Holyhood Cemetery; Brookline, Massachusetts
- Education: Convent of the Sacred Heart
- Parent(s): Joseph P. Kennedy Sr. Rose Fitzgerald Kennedy
- Family: Kennedy family

Rose Marie "Rosemary" Kennedy (September 13, 1918 – January 7, 2005) was the eldest daughter born to Joseph P. Kennedy Sr. and Rose Fitzgerald Kennedy. She was a sister of President John F. Kennedy and senators Robert F. and Ted Kennedy.

As a child she reportedly exhibited developmental delays. In her young adult years, she became "increasingly irritable and difficult", according to the recollection of her sister Eunice. In response to these issues, her father arranged a lobotomy on her in 1941, when she was 23 years of age. The procedure left her permanently incapacitated and rendered her unable to speak intelligibly.

She spent most of the rest of her life being cared for at St. Coletta, an institution in Jefferson, Wisconsin. The truth about her situation and whereabouts was kept secret for decades. While she was initially isolated from her siblings and extended family following her lobotomy, she did go on to visit them during her later life.

== Family and early life ==
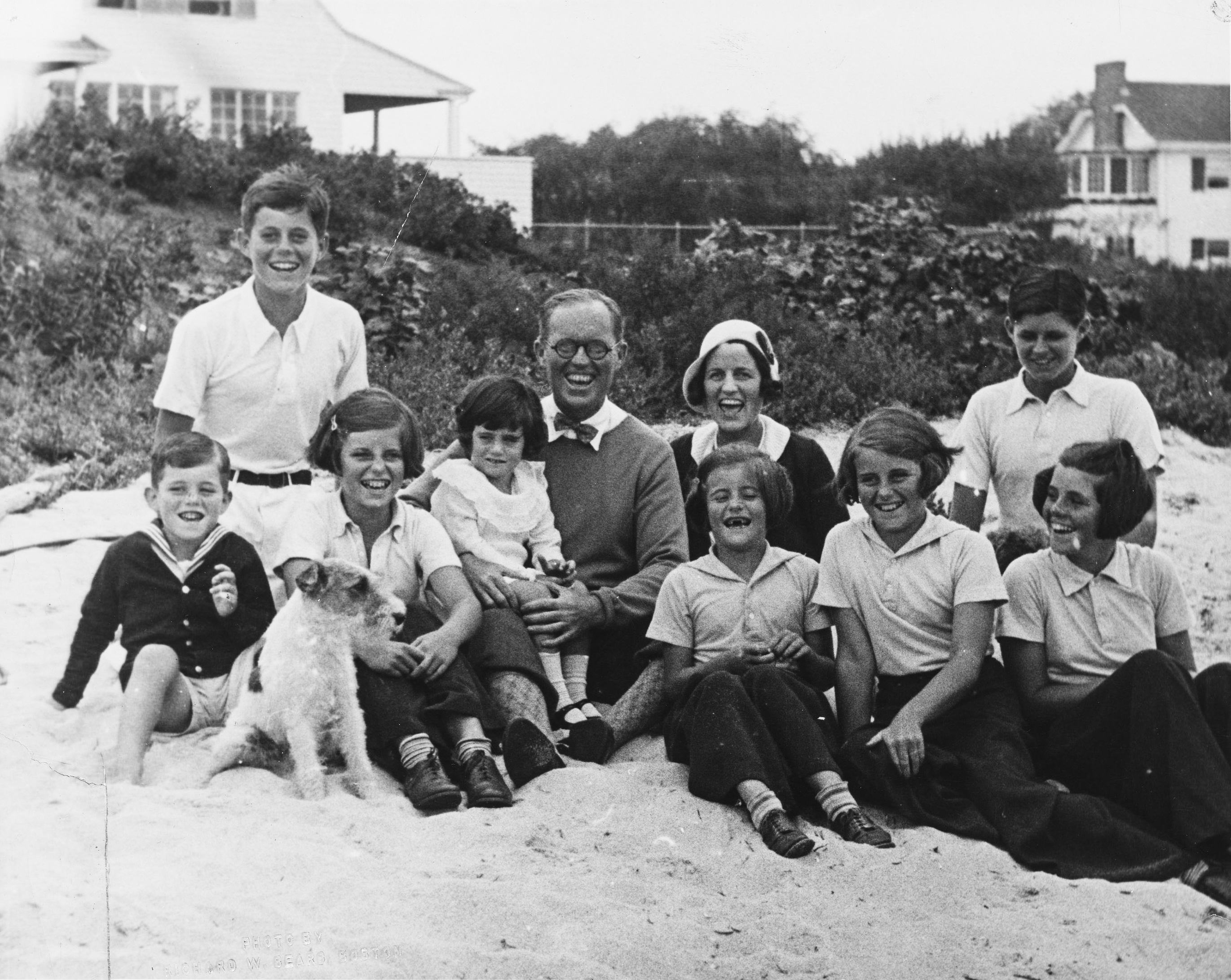
The Kennedy family at Hyannis Port, Massachusetts in 1931, with Rosemary on the far right

Rose Marie Kennedy was born at her parents' home in Brookline, Massachusetts, on September 13, 1918. She was the third child and first daughter of Joseph P. Kennedy Sr. and Rose Fitzgerald. She was named after her mother and was commonly called Rosemary or Rosie. During her birth, the doctor was not immediately available because of an outbreak of the Spanish influenza epidemic, and the nurse ordered Rose Kennedy to keep her legs closed, forcing the baby's head to stay in the birth canal for two hours. The action resulted in a harmful loss of oxygen. As Rosemary began to grow, her parents noticed she was not reaching the basic developmental steps normally reached at a certain month or year. At two years old, she had a hard time sitting up, crawling, and learning to walk.

Accounts of Kennedy's life indicated that she had an intellectual disability, although some have raised questions about the Kennedys' accounts of the nature and scope of her disability. A biographer wrote that Rose Kennedy did not confide in her friends and that she pretended her daughter was developing typically, with relatives other than the immediate family knowing nothing of Rosemary's disability. Despite the help of tutors, Rosemary had trouble learning to read and write. At age 11, she was sent to a Pennsylvania boarding school for people with intellectual disabilities.

At age 16, Kennedy was sent to the Sacred Heart Convent in Elmhurst, Providence, Rhode Island, where she was educated separately from the other students. Two nuns and a special teacher, Miss Newton, worked with her all day in a separate classroom. The Kennedys gave the school a new tennis court for their efforts. Her reading, writing, spelling, and counting skills were reported to be at a fourth-grade level (ages 9–10). During this period, her mother arranged for her older brother John to accompany her to a tea dance. Thanks to him, she appeared "not different at all" during the dance.

Rosemary read few books, such as Winnie-the-Pooh. Diaries written by her in the late 1930s, and published in the 1980s, reveal a young woman whose life was filled with outings to the opera, tea dances, dress fittings, and other social interests. Kennedy accompanied her family to the coronation of Pope Pius XII in Rome in 1939. She also visited the White House. Kennedy's parents told Woman's Day that she was "studying to be a kindergarten teacher," and Parents was told that while she had "an interest in social welfare work, she is said to harbor a secret longing to go on the stage." When The Boston Globe requested an interview with Rosemary, her father's assistant prepared a response which Rosemary copied out laboriously:

I have always had serious tastes and understand life is not given us just for enjoyment. For some time past, I have been studying the well known psychological method of Dr. Maria Montessori and I got my degree in teaching last year.

In 1938, Kennedy was presented as a debutante to King George VI and Queen Elizabeth at Buckingham Palace during her father's service as the United States Ambassador to the United Kingdom. Kennedy practiced the complicated royal curtsy for hours. At the event, she tripped and nearly fell. Rose Kennedy never discussed the incident and treated the debut as a triumph. The crowd made no sign, and the King and the Queen smiled as if nothing had happened.

== Lobotomy ==
According to Kennedy's sister Eunice, when Rosemary returned to the United States from the United Kingdom in 1940, she became "increasingly irritable and difficult" at the age of 22. Kennedy would often experience convulsions and fly into violent rages, during which she would hit and injure others. After being expelled from a summer camp in western Massachusetts and staying only a few months at a Philadelphia boarding school, Kennedy was sent to a convent school in Washington, D.C. Kennedy began sneaking out of the convent school at night. The nuns at the convent thought that Rosemary might be involved with sexual partners and that she could contract a sexually transmitted disease or become pregnant. Her occasionally erratic behavior frustrated her parents; her father was especially worried that Kennedy's behavior would shame and embarrass the family and damage his and his children's political careers.

When Kennedy was 23 years old, doctors told her father that a lobotomy would help calm her mood swings and stop her occasional violent outbursts. Joe Sr. decided that Rosemary should have a lobotomy; however, he did not inform his wife of this decision until after the procedure was completed. The procedure took place in November 1941. In Ronald Kessler's 1996 biography of Joe Sr., Sins of the Father, James W. Watts, who carried out the procedure with Walter Freeman (both of George Washington University School of Medicine & Health Sciences), is quoted in the following passage:

After Rosemary was mildly sedated, "We went through the top of the head," Dr. Watts recalled. "I think she was awake. She had a mild tranquilizer. I made a surgical incision in the brain through the skull. It was near the front. It was on both sides. We just made a small incision, no more than an inch." The instrument Dr. Watts used looked like a butter knife. He swung it up and down to cut brain tissue. "We put an instrument inside", he said. As Dr. Watts cut, Dr. Freeman asked Rosemary some questions. For example, he asked her to recite the Lord's Prayer or sing "God Bless America" or count backward ... "We made an estimate on how far to cut based on how she responded." When Rosemary began to become incoherent, they stopped.

Watts told Kessler that in his opinion, Kennedy did not have "mental retardation" but rather a form of depression. A review of all of the papers written by the two doctors confirmed Watts' declaration. All of the patients the two doctors lobotomized were diagnosed as having some form of mental disorder. Bertram S. Brown, director of the National Institute of Mental Health who was previously an aide to President Kennedy, told Kessler that Joe Kennedy referred to his daughter Rosemary as mentally retarded rather than mentally ill in order to protect John's reputation for a presidential run and that the family's "lack of support for mental illness is part of a lifelong family denial of what was really so". It quickly became apparent that the procedure had caused catastrophic damage. Kennedy's mental capacity diminished to that of a two-year-old child. She could not walk or speak intelligibly and was incontinent.

=== Aftermath ===
After the lobotomy, Kennedy was almost immediately institutionalized. She initially lived for several years at Craig House, a private psychiatric hospital around 90 minutes north of New York City. In 1949, she was relocated to Jefferson, Wisconsin, where she lived for the rest of her life on the grounds of the St. Coletta School for Exceptional Children (formerly known as "St. Coletta Institute for Backward Youth"). Archbishop Richard Cushing of Boston had told her father about St. Coletta's, an institution for more than 300 people with disabilities, and her father traveled to and built a private house for her about a mile outside St. Coletta's main campus near Alverno House, which was designed for adults who needed lifelong care. The nuns called the house "the Kennedy cottage". Two Catholic nuns, Sister Margaret Ann and Sister Leona, provided her care along with a student and a woman who worked on ceramics with Kennedy three nights a week. Kennedy had a car that could be used to take her for rides and a dog which she could take on walks.

In response to her condition, Kennedy's parents separated her from her family. Her mother did not visit her for 20 years and her father did not visit his daughter at the institution at all. In Rosemary: The Hidden Kennedy Daughter, author Kate Clifford Larson stated that Kennedy's lobotomy was hidden from the family for 20 years; none of her siblings knew of her whereabouts. While her older brother John was campaigning for re-election to the U.S. Senate in 1958, the Kennedy family explained away her absence by claiming she was reclusive. The family did not publicly explain her absence until 1961, after John had been elected president. The Kennedys did not reveal that she was institutionalized because of a failed lobotomy, but instead said that she was deemed "mentally retarded". In 1961, after Joe Sr. had a stroke that left him unable to speak and walk, Rosemary's siblings were made aware of her location.

Rosemary's condition was revealed publicly by her sister Eunice in a 1962 interview to The Saturday Evening Post, but her lobotomy did not become public knowledge until 1987, when historian Doris Kearns Goodwin revealed it in her book The Fitzgeralds and the Kennedys.

== Later life and death ==
Following her father's death in 1969, the Kennedys gradually involved Rosemary in family life again. She was occasionally taken to visit relatives in Florida and Washington, D.C., as well as her childhood home on Cape Cod, Massachusetts. By that time, Rosemary had learned to walk again, but did so with a limp. She never regained the ability to speak clearly and her arm was palsied. Her condition is sometimes credited as the inspiration for her sister Eunice to found the Special Olympics in 1968, although Eunice told The New York Times in 1995 that Kennedy was just one of the disabled people she would have over to her house to swim, and that the games should not focus on any single individual.

Kennedy died from natural causes on January 7, 2005, aged 86, at the Fort Atkinson Memorial Hospital in Fort Atkinson, Wisconsin, with her siblings (sisters Jean, Eunice, and Patricia and brother Ted) by her side. She was buried beside her parents at Holyhood Cemetery in Brookline, Massachusetts.

== See also ==
- Kennedy family
- Kennedy curse
