= Jack Hofsiss =

American director (1950–2016)

- Born: John Bernard Hofsiss; September 28, 1950; Brooklyn, New York, U.S.
- Died: September 13, 2016 (aged 65); Manhattan, New York, U.S.
- Occupations: Theatre, film, and television director

John Bernard Hofsiss (September 28, 1950 – September 13, 2016) was an American theatre, film, and television director. He received a Tony Award for his direction in 1979 of The Elephant Man on Broadway; at the time, he was the youngest director to have ever received it. The production also garnered him a Drama Desk Award, Outer Critics Circle Award, Obie Award, and New York Drama Critics Circle Award. Director of Family Secrets in the year 1984; starring Melissa Gilbert, James Spader, Stefanie Powers, and Maureen Stapleton.

== Biography ==
John Bernard Hofsiss was born on September 28, 1950, in Brooklyn. He grew up in New York City in a Catholic family, and served as an altar boy in church. He said it was his "first experience of theatre". He was a 1971 graduate of Georgetown University.

While at Georgetown University he co-wrote and directed an original student musical "Senior Prom." This was staged and produced for what became a 3-year run at the "O" Street Theater, formerly the Washington Theater Club. After a directing stint at the Folger Theatre in Washington, D.C., Hofsiss worked for several years as a casting director in New York.

He began directing TV productions, beginning with The Best of Families, a mini-series, in 1977. He also directed for TV productions of Out of Our Father's House (1978), 3 by Cheever: The Sorrows of Gin (1979), The Elephant Man (1982), "Family Secrets (1984), and Cat on a Hot Tin Roof (1985). In 1982, he directed the film I'm Dancing as Fast as I Can.

In 1985, Hofsiss dived into a pool and had a spinal cord injury, resulting in paralysis up to his mid-chest. He spent eight months at the Rusk Institute of Rehabilitation Medicine and used a wheelchair. Just months after the accident he returned to the theater scene, directing All the Way Home at the Berkshire Theatre Festival. Hofsiss appeared in the documentary The Needs of Kim Stanley in 2005.

At the end of his life, Hofsiss was teaching directing at HB Studio in New York City. The last play he directed was Design for Living in 2015, supported by the Noël Coward Foundation.

Hofsiss spoke candidly about the effect disability had on his life and work in the book Chronicles of Courage: Very Special Artists written by Jean Kennedy Smith and George Plimpton and published by Random House.

== Death ==
Hofsiss died at his home in Manhattan on September 13, 2016, 2 weeks before his 66th birthday. He had been hospitalized for respiratory distress.
