= The Bully Pulpit =

2013 historical book by Doris Kearns Goodwin

The Bully Pulpit: Theodore Roosevelt, William Howard Taft, and the Golden Age of Journalism
- Author: Doris Kearns Goodwin
- Language: English
- Published: November 5, 2013 by Simon & Schuster
- Publication place: United States

The Bully Pulpit: Theodore Roosevelt, William Howard Taft, and the Golden Age of Journalism is a 909-page historical nonfiction book written by Doris Kearns Goodwin that was published by Simon & Schuster in November 2013. The book centers on the relationship of Theodore Roosevelt and William Howard Taft and the activities of investigative journalists who impacted on public opinion during the Progressive Era. Upon its release, the book received positive reviews, with reviewers praising the research and readability, and won several accolades.

== Background ==
The Bully Pulpit is the seventh book by Doris Kearns Goodwin. She spent seven years researching the book. Goodwin stated that initially she wished to write a history of the Progressive Era and Theodore Roosevelt, but determined Taft to be "far more sympathetic if flawed" than she first considered, which resulted in the book centering around the evolving relationship of Roosevelt and William Howard Taft.

== Contents ==
External videos
- 2014 C-SPAN interview with the author

The book covers the Progressive Era that transformed the United States at the turn of the century, and centers on the relationship of Theodore Roosevelt and William Howard Taft as key players along with their wives, Edith Roosevelt and Nellie Taft, which evolved from friendship to rivalry. In parallel, it chronicles the activities of a group of writers working for McClure's magazine, such as Ida Tarbell and Lincoln Steffens, who helped influence public opinion with their investigative journalism focusing on the increasing power of "trusts" and their associated abuses of power. The book also describes a perception of America that is different from our modern day perception.

== Reception ==
The Bully Pulpit received positive reviews upon its release. Bill Keller from The New York Times praised the "rich and elegant language", and description of the relationships of other leaders, journalists and cabinet members with Roosevelt and Taft that resulted in "most of her men and women with personality" and for the story to "come together like a well-wrought novel". He also commented positively on the usage of detailed newspapers, magazines, and letters. This sentiment was shared by Publishers Weekly, which awarded a starred review, complimenting its relevance and the usage of quotes and letters used to show "[t]he complex relationship and soured political camaraderie between Roosevelt and Taft". Reviewing for the Booklist, Jay Freeman also gave a starred review, and described it as a "superb re-creation of a period when many politicians, journalists, and citizens of differing political affiliations viewed government as a force for public good". Another Booklist review by Alan Moores praised the book's details on Roosevelt and accessibility. Similarly, John Steele Gordon complimented that the book "amply demonstrates" Roosevelt's personality and the differences between him, its readability, research, as well as the Goodwin "touchingly describing" their meeting in 1918. Kirkus Reviews also gave a starred review, praising the book's coverage on investigative journalism and concluded that it was [a] notable, psychologically charged study in leadership".

Bill Gates also recommend the book in his 2014 Summer Reading List, commenting positively on the theme of social change in the book. It also received several accolades, including the 2014 Andrew Carnegie Medal for Excellence in Nonfiction and 2013 Booklist Editors' Choice for Adult Books.

== See also ==
- Bully pulpit
