= Lynne McTaggart =

American author (born 1951)

- Born: January 23, 1951 (age 75); New York City
- Occupations: Author, lecturer

Lynne McTaggart (born 23 January 1951, New York City) is an American alternative medicine author, publisher, journalist, lecturer and activist. She is the author of six books, including The Field, The Intention Experiment and The Power of 8, and is the co-creator of the alternative medicine magazine What Doctors Don't Tell You. According to her author profile, she is a spokesperson "on consciousness, the new physics, and the practices of conventional and alternative medicine." McTaggart lives in London with her husband, publisher Bryan Hubbard, and their two daughters.

== Career ==
In her autobiography McTaggart reports that after recovering from an illness using alternative medical approaches her husband suggested she start a newsletter on the risks of some medical practices and devised the title: "What Doctors Don't Tell You". In 1996 McTaggart published the book with the same name.

She and her husband set up a public company in 2001, What Doctors Don't Tell You plc, later Conatus plc, which published newsletters, magazines and audio-tapes based on conferences and seminars including, What Doctors Don't Tell You, PROOF!, and Living the Field. This company was wound up in 2009.

A new company, Wddty Publishing Ltd, run by McTaggart and her husband, took over the What Doctors Don't Tell You website, and New Age Publishing Ltd for McTaggart's other publishing and public-speaking activities. Publication of their monthly magazine What Doctors Don't Tell You restarted in August 2012, in a glossy format aimed at newsagent and high-street distribution, instead of using the previous subscription model, and carrying paid advertising, something McTaggart had originally said WDDTY would not do.

In her book The Field, McTaggart asserts that the universe is unified by an interactive field. The book has been translated into fourteen languages.

In a later book, The Intention Experiment, she discusses research in the field of human consciousness which she says supports the theory that "the universe is connected by a vast quantum energy field" and can be influenced by thought. Michael Shermer states that this belief is contradicted by conflicting evidence (e.g. studies on intercessory prayer).

McTaggart has a personal-development program called "Living The Field" which is based on an idiosyncratic interpretation of the zero point field as applied to quantum mechanics. She appears in the extended version of the movie What the Bleep Do We Know!?, (2004).

From 1996 until 2002 McTaggart and her husband Bryan Hubbard published the monthly newsletter Mother Knows Best, later renamed Natural Parent magazine, focusing on home schooling, environmental and health concerns, including nutrition and homeopathy. They also published related books: My Learning Child, My Spiritual Child and My Healthy Child.

Significant portions of her book about Kathleen Cavendish, Marchioness of Hartington appeared without attribution or permission in The Fitzgeralds and the Kennedys: An American Saga (1987), by historian Doris Kearns Goodwin. Goodwin eventually resolved the matter with a public apology to McTaggart and a "substantial" monetary settlement.

== Criticism ==
Ben Goldacre has criticized McTaggart for speaking out against the drug Tamiflu, claiming that her concerns about the drug were completely unfounded. While Goldacre is correct that research has shown that Tamiflu can have positive affects on reducing mortality in patients with influenza H1N1, he is not correct in saying that McTaggarts statements are completely unfounded. Medical research does also support McTaggarts statements that there can be harmful effects.

The Field has been characterized by Mark Henderson of The Times as pseudoscience, focusing on her personal understanding of quantum physics as a misconception.

McTaggart was reported to have threatened Simon Singh with legal action after he contacted Comag, the distributors of WDDTY, complaining that the magazine was "largely unscientific" and "promoting advice that could potentially harm readers." "Also, many of the adverts appear to make pseudoscientific and unsubstantiated claims," he said. "I even offered to meet with Comag and introduce them to medical experts, but they have not accepted this invitation. When I suggested that I would blog about our email exchange, their reaction was to tell me in no uncertain terms: 'I should inform you that we have sought legal advice in respect of this matter. We would take any attempts to damage our reputation on social media or elsewhere very seriously.'"

In the months between first publication of What Doctors Don't Tell You in magazine form, and February 2013, 54 breaches of the Code of Advertising Practice in 11 adverts were adjudicated and upheld by the Advertising Standards Authority along with a further 11 informally resolved cases, concerning adverts in the first two issues, with more breaches in subsequent issues too.

In an interview on BBC Radio 4, GP and author Margaret McCartney stated: "I'm astounded that Lynne thinks this is an evidence-based publication. It's anything but," she said. "The problem with evidence is that it can tell you things that you'd rather not know. A lot of the time medicine does do harm but that's why doctors and scientists are duty-bound to put their research findings out there and to stop doing things that cause harm. What we shouldn't do is abandon medicine and the scientific method and go straight for alternative medicine with no good evidence that that works either." She criticised stories in the magazine as "absolute rubbish" and "ridiculously alarmist".

In an article in The Times in October 2013 Tom Whipple, science correspondent, said that "Experts are calling on high street shops to stop selling a magazine that claims that vitamin C cures HIV, suggests homeopathy could treat cancer and implies that the cervical cancer vaccine has killed hundreds of girls."

== Personal life ==
McTaggart is married to publisher Bryan Hubbard and lives in London with her two daughters.

== Works ==
- Kathleen Kennedy: Her Life and Times (1983) ISBN 0-385-27415-7
- What Doctors Don't Tell You: The Truth About The Dangers Of Modern Medicine (1999) ISBN 0-380-80761-0
- The Cancer Handbook: What's Really Working (2000) ISBN 1-890612-18-9
- The Field: The Quest for the Secret Force of the Universe (2003) ISBN 0-06-093117-5
- The Intention Experiment: Using Your Thoughts to Change Your Life and the World (2007) ISBN 0-00-719458-7
- The Bond: Connecting through the Space Between Us (2011) ISBN 978-1-4391-5794-7
- The Power of Eight: Harnessing the Miraculous Energies of a Small Group to Heal Others, Your Life, and the World (2017) ISBN 978-1501115547
