= No Ordinary Time =

1994 book by Doris Kearns Goodwin

No Ordinary Time: Franklin and Eleanor Roosevelt: The Home Front in World War II
- Author: Doris Kearns Goodwin
- Genre: History
- Publisher: Simon & Schuster
- Publication date: 1994
- Publication place: United States
- Pages: 759
- Awards: Pulitzer Prize for History
- ISBN: 978-0684804484
- Preceded by: The Fitzgeralds and the Kennedys: An American Saga
- Followed by: Wait Till Next Year: A Memoir

No Ordinary Time: Franklin and Eleanor Roosevelt: The Home Front in World War II is a 1994 historical, biographical book by American author and presidential historian Doris Kearns Goodwin published by Simon & Schuster.

Based on interviews with 86 people who knew them personally, the book chronicles the lives of President Franklin D. Roosevelt and First Lady Eleanor Roosevelt, focusing particularly on the period between May 10, 1940 (the end of the so-called "Phoney War" stage of World War II) and President Roosevelt's death on April 12, 1945. The title is taken from the speech Eleanor Roosevelt gave at the 1940 Democratic National Convention in hopes of unifying the, at the time, divided Democratic party.

No Ordinary Time was awarded the 1995 Pulitzer Prize for History.

Alan J. Pakula was working on a screenplay based upon the book at the time of his death in 1998.
