= Howie Seago =

American actor and director (born 1953)

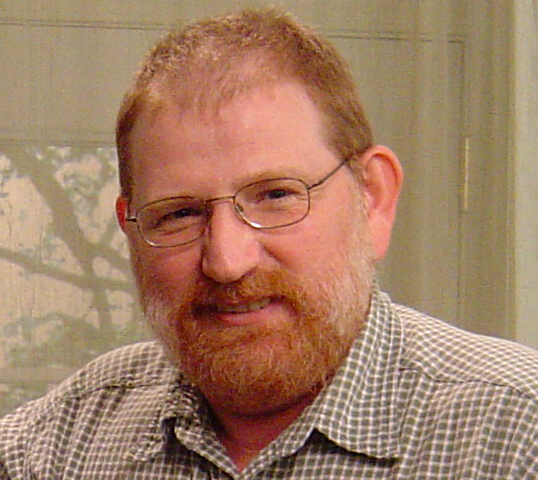
- Born: December 15, 1953 (age 72); Tacoma, Washington, United States
- Occupations: Television actor, Theatre actor, Theatre director
- Spouse: Lori Seago
- Children: 2

Howie Seago (born December 15, 1953) is an American actor and director.

== Early life, family and education ==
Seago, who is deaf, was born in Tacoma, Washington. His father was hard of hearing, and that side of the family had a history of hearing loss. Howie has two brothers (one is hard of hearing; one is deaf) and two sisters (who are both hearing). He first began to develop his mimicking abilities as a child with the help of his mother.

He began his serious acting work in college, when he joined the National Theatre of the Deaf. His major was psychology.

== Career ==
Screen

Seago's television career includes appearances on Hunter, Star Trek: The Next Generation (episode: "Loud as a Whisper") and The Equalizer as well as involvement in the children's show, Rainbow's End. He also had a significant role in Beyond Silence, a German film about a hearing girl growing up with deaf parents, directed by Caroline Link.

Stage

He has also produced some plays, using both hearing and deaf actors. He is a central figure of the American Deaf Community, especially as an author and teacher.

His break-out role was in Peter Sellars' production of Ajax. He was later cast by David Byrne for the German production of The Forest (1989), because he was so impressed with Seago's performance. This production was directed by Robert Wilson for the Berliner Festspiele. In Austria, Seago worked as an actor for the Salzburg Festival and the Vienna Festival and as a director for ARBOS - Company for Music and Theatre.

Since 2009, Seago has been a company member with the Oregon Shakespeare Festival, in Ashland, Oregon, where he is the first deaf actor to perform in the festival's history. His roles there have included The Ghost of Hamlet's Father in Hamlet, Ned Poins in Henry IV, Part I and Henry IV, Part II, Marcellus Washburn in The Music Man, Bob Ewell in To Kill a Mockingbird, Duke Senior in As You Like It, King Cymbeline in Cymbeline, Little John in "The Heart of Robinhood", and Wolf in Into the Woods.

== Honors and awards ==
Seago has been honored many times, including being a recipient of the Helen Hayes Award.; Dramalogue Award, and Joe Velez Memorial Award. He also co-produced the PBS television show, Rainbow's End, which won an Emmy

Seago spoke candidly about the effect his deafness has had on his life and work in the book Chronicles of Courage: Very Special Artists written by Jean Kennedy Smith and George Plimpton and published by Random House.

== Personal life ==
Seago's wife Lori is a fan of Star Trek. They have two sons, Ryan and Kyle Seago, neither of whom is deaf. The family resides in Seattle.

== Written works ==
- Seago, Howie. In an Alien World of Sound, ARBOS-Edition, Vienna-Salzburg-Klagenfurt, 1996/1997.

== Filmography ==
Howie Seago film and television credits
Year	Title	Role	Notes
1997	Holland Festival	Ajax	Episode: "Ajax"
1988	Hunter	Austin McCabe	Episode: "Death Signs" (S4.E18)
1989	Star Trek: The Next Generation	Riva	Episode: "Loud as a Whisper" (S2.E5)
1989	The Equalizer	Ron	Episode: "Silent Fury" (S4.E12)
1996	Beyond Silence	Martin	Film. German: Jenseits der Stille
2008	The Legend of the Mountain Man	Grandpa Dale	Film.
2008	The Deaf Man	The Deaf Man	Short
2021	Grisha		Film
	Rainbow's End		? episode(s)
