= The Fitzgeralds and the Kennedys =

1987 nonficfion book

- First edition
- Author: Doris Kearns Goodwin
- Subject: Kennedy family, Fitzgerald family
- Genre: History
- Publisher: Simon & Schuster
- Publication date: 1987
- Publication place: United States
- Media type: Book
- Pages: 932
- ISBN: 9780312909338
- Dewey Decimal: 920.00929162073
- LC Class: CT274.F58 G66
- Preceded by: Lyndon Johnson and the American Dream
- Followed by: No Ordinary Time: Franklin and Eleanor Roosevelt: The Home Front in World War II

The Fitzgeralds and the Kennedys is a 1987 book written by Doris Kearns Goodwin and published by Simon & Schuster. It covers two Boston Irish American families, the Kennedys and the Fitzgeralds, from John F. Fitzgerald's baptism to John Fitzgerald Kennedy's inauguration. Upon its release, the book's insightfulness and detail were generally praised by several publications. However, in 2002, The Weekly Standard determined that the book plagiarised three other books, which were subject to criticism.

== Contents ==
The book opens with Rose Kennedy's father John Francis Fitzgerald being baptised in 1863 and subsequently focuses on his rise and fall in Massachusetts politics in its first third. The book then covers the courtship and marriage of Rose and Joe Kennedy, also commenting upon Joe's failures, alcoholism and the prefrontal lobotomy on his eldest daughter Rosemary. The final section surrounding two eldest sons Joe Jr. and Jack and second eldest daughter Kick reaching adulthood which Goodwin dubs "the Golden Trio", ending with the inauguration of John F. Kennedy in 1961.

== Background ==
Goodwin previously wrote Lyndon Johnson and the American Dream. During research, Goodwin used 150 "cartons of unsorted personal papers" and interviewed numerous relatives and friends of the Kennedys, including Rose Kennedy.

== Reception ==
=== Critical reception ===
Kirkus awarded the book a starred review, describing it as a "lengthy but unfailingly engrossing version" and praising its freshness, details, and insights. Similarly, a review from Publishers Weekly praised the book's freshness and complimented that the book avoided melodrama. The review additionally stated that the book is "evenhanded, usually sympathetic treatment" and predicted that the book would be "immensely popular" but criticised that the story ended in 1961. This sentiment was echoed by Christopher Lehmann-Haupt from The New York Times, who praised the coverage of the characters as "alive and individual" and the freshness despite critiquing that the story opened predictably. Lehmann-Haupt also called the treatment of failures for the two families as candid.

Geoffrey C. Ward, in another review from The New York Times, commented that the first third was the most original and described that Goodwin "skillfully evokes life in the squalid North End slums from which young Fitzgerald" and described the treatment of Joseph Kennedy as "oddly affecting". However, Ward was negative towards "the voices of those family members and close friends of the Kennedys" Goodwin interviewed, including Rose Kennedy, stating that "they are too frequently rendered in language that sounds more like that of the interviewer than the interviewee" and criticised the credibility of the interviews as main sources for quotations. The New England Quarterly praised the book's insights into family relationships, stating that the characters were "vivid and lovely" and described the coverage of the relationships between the children as fascinating. However, akin to Ward, criticism was directed towards Goodwin's objectivity due to the author's "close relationships" with the family and usage of interviews; the review further disapproved of the "unwillingness to weigh the critical evidence" surrounding various questions regarding the family. The book was also reviewed in Booklist.

=== Controversy ===
In 2002, The Weekly Standard reported that The Fitzgeralds and the Kennedys used phrases and sentences from three books without attribution. The plagiarism controversy received criticism; Goodwin subsequently resigned from the Pulitzer Prize Board and regular guest position on the PBS NewsHour program.
