= Jean Kennedy Smith =

American diplomat (1928–2020)

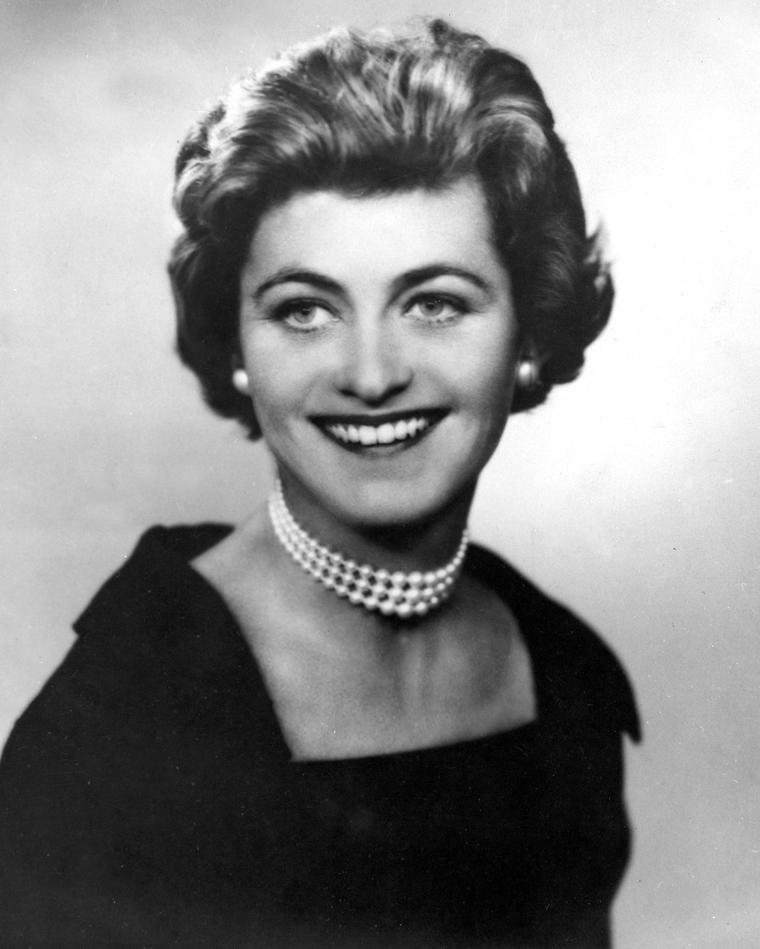

United States Ambassador to Ireland
- In office June 24, 1993 – September 17, 1998
- President: Bill Clinton
- Preceded by: William H. G. FitzGerald
- Succeeded by: Mike Sullivan

Personal details
- Born: Jean Ann Kennedy; February 20, 1928 Boston, Massachusetts, U.S.
- Died: June 17, 2020 (aged 92) New York City, U.S.
- Party: Democratic
- Spouse: Stephen Edward Smith (m. 1956; died 1990)
- Children: 4, including William
- Parent(s): Joseph P. Kennedy Sr. Rose Fitzgerald
- Relatives: Kennedy family
- Education: Manhattanville College (BA)

Jean Ann Kennedy Smith (née Kennedy; February 20, 1928 – June 17, 2020) was an American diplomat, activist, humanitarian, and author who served as United States Ambassador to Ireland from 1993 to 1998. A member of the Kennedy family, Kennedy was the eighth of nine children (and youngest daughter) born to Joseph P. Kennedy Sr. and Rose Kennedy. Her siblings included President of the United States John F. Kennedy, United States Senator Robert F. Kennedy of New York, United States Senator Ted Kennedy of Massachusetts, Rosemary Kennedy, and Special Olympics founder Eunice Kennedy Shriver.

As Ambassador to Ireland, Smith was instrumental in the Northern Ireland peace process as President Bill Clinton's representative in Dublin. She successfully urged President Clinton to grant a controversial visa to Sinn Féin President Gerry Adams; Adams's ensuing trip to the United States helped lead to an Irish Republican Army ceasefire. Smith was later reprimanded by Secretary of State Warren Christopher for retaliating against two employees who disagreed with her stance on the Adams visa. Smith stepped down from her ambassador position shortly after the signing of the historic Good Friday Agreement in 1998. President of Ireland Mary McAleese conferred honorary Irish citizenship on Smith in 1998 in recognition of her service to the country.

Smith was the founder of VSA Kennedy Center (previously Very Special Arts), an internationally recognized non-profit organization dedicated to creating a society where people with disabilities can engage with the arts. In 2011, she was awarded the Presidential Medal of Freedom, the highest civilian honor in the United States, by President Barack Obama for her work with VSA and with people with disabilities.

== Early years ==
Jean Ann Kennedy was born on February 20, 1928, at St. Margaret's Center for Women and Children in the Dorchester section of Boston, Massachusetts, on her elder sister Kathleen Kennedy Cavendish's eighth birthday. Kennedy was the eighth of nine children born to Joseph P. Kennedy Sr. and Rose Kennedy. Her other siblings were Joseph P. Kennedy Jr., U.S. President and Senator John F. Kennedy, Rose Marie Kennedy, Special Olympics founder Eunice Kennedy Shriver, Patricia Kennedy Lawford, and U.S. Attorney General and U.S. Senator Robert F. Kennedy. Her younger brother was U.S. Senator Ted Kennedy.

Kennedy has been described as the shyest and most guarded of the Kennedy children. She attended Manhattanville College (at the time a Society of the Sacred Heart school, and still located in Purchase, New York), where she befriended future sisters-in-law Ethel Kennedy (who married Kennedy's older brother Robert in 1950) and Joan Bennett Kennedy (who married Kennedy's younger brother Ted in 1958). Kennedy graduated from Manhattanville in 1949.

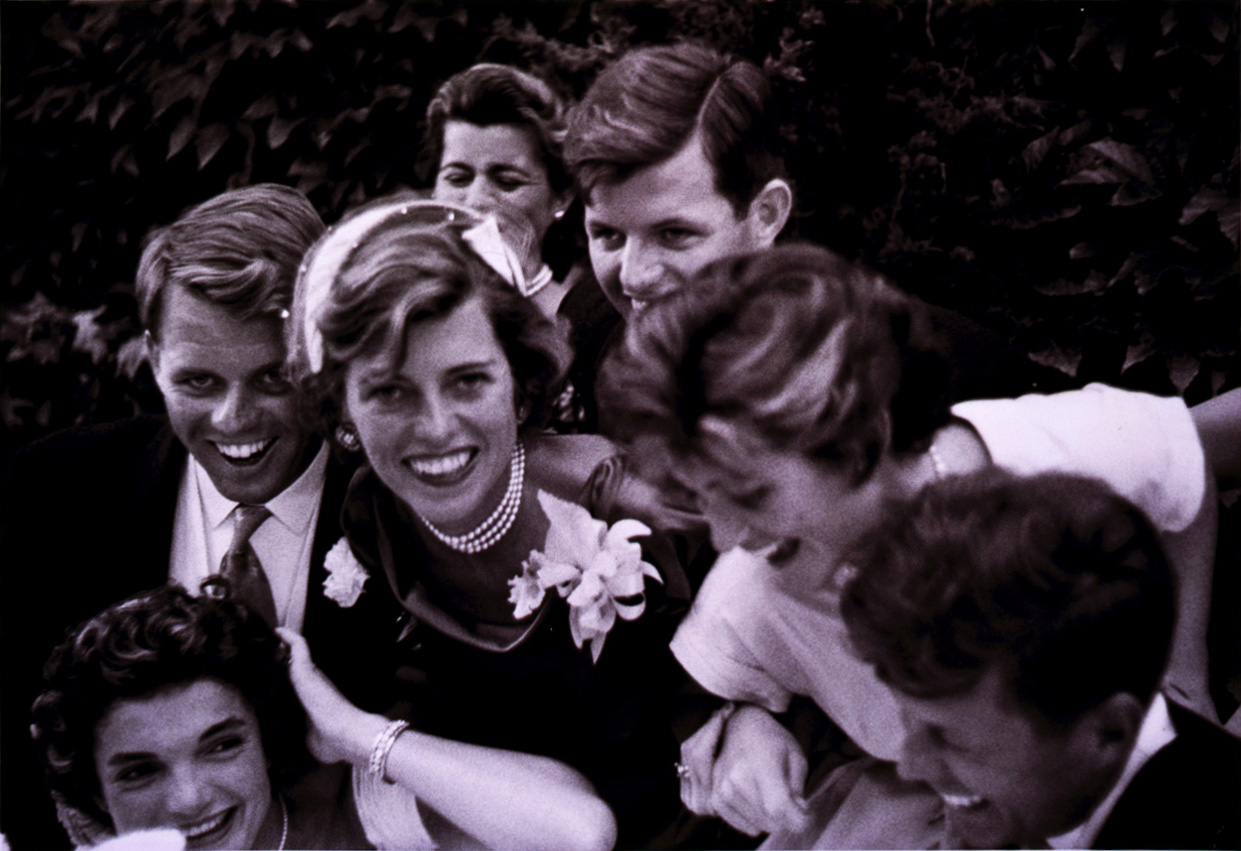
Jean Kennedy with her siblings at the wedding of John F. Kennedy and Jacqueline Bouvier, 1953

== Career ==
=== Political involvement ===
Kennedy (known as Jean Kennedy Smith following her 1956 marriage to Stephen Edward Smith) was intricately involved with the political career of her older brother John. She worked on his 1946 congressional campaign in Boston, his 1952 U.S. Senate campaign in Massachusetts, and, ultimately, his presidential campaign in 1960. She and her siblings helped John knock on doors in primary states such as West Virginia and Wisconsin, and on the campaign trail played the role of sister more than volunteer, citing her parents' family lesson of "working together for something".

=== Very Special Arts ===
In 1974, Smith founded Very Special Arts, now known as the Department of VSA and Accessibility at the John F. Kennedy Center for the Performing Arts. VSA provides arts and education programming for youth and adults with disabilities. As of 2011, VSA's programs reportedly served "some 276,000 students in 43 states and 52 countries". Smith traveled extensively throughout the world on behalf of VSA to advocate for greater inclusion in the arts for people with disabilities. Her book, Chronicles of Courage: Very Special Artists, co-written with George Plimpton, was published by Random House in April 1993.

=== U.S. Ambassador to Ireland ===
In 1993, President Bill Clinton appointed Smith the U.S. Ambassador to Ireland. The appointment continued a legacy of diplomacy begun by Smith's father, Joseph Kennedy, who was the United States Ambassador to the United Kingdom during the administration of U.S. President Franklin D. Roosevelt. As ambassador, Smith played a significant role in the Northern Ireland peace process.

In January 1994, President Clinton granted a U.S. visa to Sinn Féin leader Gerry Adams. Smith played a major part in persuading Clinton to take this action, and she was criticized for her stance. The visa was opposed by Great Britain, which considered Adams a terrorist due to his links to the Irish Republican Army. In her brother Ted's memoir, he said, "Jean was convinced that Adams no longer believed that continuing the armed struggle was the way to achieve the IRA's objective of a united Ireland", and added that it took "only a couple of hours' conversation with Jean...to discover what was the most important thing on her mind – the opportunity for a breakthrough in the Northern Ireland stalemate". Adams later stated that his 1994 trip to the United States—made possible by the visa—was a key step in the Northern Ireland peace process that led to the Irish Republican Army ceasefire in August 1994.

In March 1996, Smith was reprimanded by U.S. Secretary of State Warren Christopher for retaliating against two Foreign Service Officers at the Embassy of the United States in Dublin who had objected to her recommendation to the U.S. government to grant Adams the visa and had sent in a "Dissent Channel" message. The Foreign Service Journal called the U.S. State Department's report on the matter "scathingly critical".

Smith's management of the embassy came under criticism by the Boston Herald in December 1996, when she reportedly pressured embassy staff to spend taxpayer money to refurbish her residence in Dublin. Smith was also alleged to have violated U.S. conflict-of-interest laws. The United States Department of Justice issued a press release on September 22, 2000, announcing that she had paid $5,000 in a civil settlement to resolve the allegations.

As a demonstration of her ecumenical views, on at least one occasion, Smith—a Roman Catholic—received communion in a cathedral of the Church of Ireland, an autonomous province of the Anglican Communion.

President of Ireland Mary McAleese conferred honorary Irish citizenship on Smith in 1998, in recognition of her service to the country. During a ceremony, McAleese praised Smith's "fixedness of purpose". Irish Taoiseach (Prime Minister) Bertie Ahern told Smith, "You have helped bring about a better life for everyone throughout Ireland."

On July 4, 1998, about three months after the historic Good Friday Agreement of April 10, 1998, Smith retired as ambassador to Ireland.

== Awards and later work ==
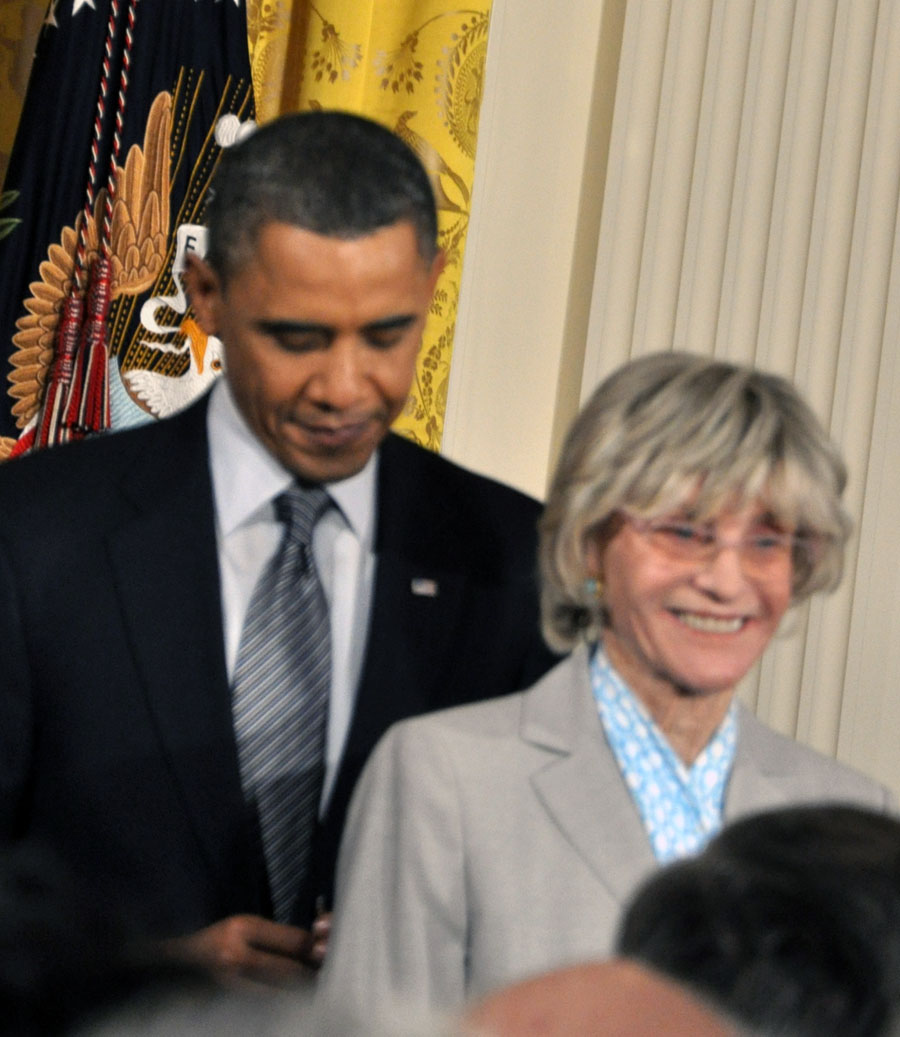
President Barack Obama bestowing Kennedy with the Presidential Medal of Freedom in 2011

A humanitarian, Smith won several awards for her work in Ireland and in the disability community. She was awarded honorary citizenship by the Government of Ireland in 1998. In 2007, Smith received the Gold Medal Award from the Éire Society of Boston for her peace efforts in Northern Ireland and for her humanitarian work with disabled children. In 2009, Smith and Ted Kennedy were honored with the Tipperary Peace Prize for their support of the peace process in Northern Ireland.

In February 2011, President Barack Obama awarded Smith the Presidential Medal of Freedom, the nation's highest civilian honor, for her work with people with disabilities.

On March 15, 2011, Smith was inducted into Irish America magazine's Irish America Hall of Fame.

Smith was listed as Ambassador Jean Kennedy Smith in the credits of the 2012 movie Lincoln for portraying a "woman shouter".

In October 2016, Smith published The Nine of Us: Growing Up Kennedy, a memoir of the Kennedy clan.

== Personal life ==
On May 19, 1956, Jean Kennedy married businessman Stephen Edward Smith in the Lady Chapel of St. Patrick's Cathedral, New York. The Smiths maintained a lower profile than some other members of the extended Kennedy family. Stephen and Jean had two biological sons, Stephen Jr., and William, and later adopted two daughters, Amanda and Kym.

Smith and her husband were present at The Ambassador Hotel in Los Angeles on June 5, 1968 during the assassination of her older brother Robert F. Kennedy.

Smith's elder sister Eunice Kennedy Shriver died on August 11, 2009. Smith did not attend Eunice's funeral on August 14, choosing to stay with their brother Ted, who was terminally ill; he died on August 25, leaving Smith as the last living child of Joseph and Rose Kennedy. Smith attended Ted's funeral on August 29.

== Death ==
Smith died at her home in Manhattan on June 17, 2020, at the age of 92. She was the last living, and the longest-lived, of the nine children of Joseph P. Kennedy Sr. and Rose Kennedy.

Diplomatic posts
Preceded by William H. G. FitzGerald	United States Ambassador to Ireland; 1993–1998	Succeeded by Michael J. Sullivan
