= 2013 Adelaide Film Festival =

Australian film festival

- Festival poster
- Opening film: Tracks
- Closing film: A Story Of Children and Film
- Location: Adelaide, Australia
- Founded: 2002
- Awards: International Award for Best Feature Film (Jin); Don Dunstan Award (Scott Hicks)
- Directors: Amanda Duthie
- No. of films: 12 (In Competition)
- Festival date: 10–20 October 2013
- Website: adelaidefilmfestival.org

The 6th Adelaide Film Festival took place in Adelaide, Australia, from 10 to 20 October 2013. This was Amanda Duthie's first year as Festival Director (after eight years at the Australian Broadcasting Corporation and eight years at the Special Broadcasting Service during the 1990s), having taken over from Katrina Sedgwick. Margaret Pomeranz and David Stratton served as the festival's patrons.

Scott Hicks received the 2013 Don Dunstan Award for his contribution to the Australian film industry.

The poster this year depicts Screen Worship, which celebrates work for all screens—cinema, television, phone and computer.

== Development ==
The 2013 festival "ran alongside the Adelaide Festival of Ideas for the first time, with a move from 'mad March' to mid October".

The festival featured 166 titles from 48 countries, including 28 world premieres, 47 Australian premieres and 34 South Australian projects. The line-up included 14 works (including seven features) which were supported by the Adelaide Film Festival Investment Fund.

The festival opened with Tracks and "with no less than two camels on the red carpet with Robyn Davidson, the author of the book on which John Curran's film is based". The festival closed with A Story of Children and Film directed by Mark Cousins.

The Turkish film Jin, directed and written by Reha Erdem, was the winner of the Foxtel Movies International Award for Best Feature Film. This was the first time the Adelaide Film Festival offered a Best Documentary Award. It was sponsored by Flinders University and the inaugural award went to Blush of Fruit.

== Competition ==
=== Juries ===
The following people were selected for the Foxtel Movies International Feature Jury:

- Al Clark, Australian producer (President)
- Liz Watts, Australian producer
- Wayne Blair, Australian writer/actor
- Lawrence Weschler, American art and film writer
- Maryanne Redpath, Berlinale Delegate for Australia and New Zealand

The Flinders University Best Documentary Jury consisted of:

- Joost Den Hartog
- Cherelle Zheng
- Kristy Matheson

=== In Competition ===
The following films were selected for the In Competition section:

English title	Original title	Director(s)	Production country/countries
Bastards	Les Salauds	Claire Dennis	France
Beatriz's War	A Guerra da Beatriz	Luigi Acquisto, Betty Reis	East Timor
Dance of Reality	La danza de la realidad	Alejandro Jodorowsky	Chile
Jin	Jîn	Reha Erdam	Turkey
How I Live Now	How I Live Now	Kevin MacDonald	United Kingdom
The Notebook	A nagy füzet	Janos Szasz	Hungary
Omar	عمر	Hany Abu-Assad	Palestine
Only Lovers Left Alive	Only Lovers Left Alive	Jim Jarmusch	UK-Ger-Fra-Cyp-US
The Past	Le Passé	Asghar Farhadi	France-Italy–Iran
The Selfish Giant	The Selfish Giant	Clio Bernard	United Kingdom
Stranger by the Lake	L'Inconnu du lac	Alain Guiraudie	France
These Final Hours	These Final Hours	Zak Hilditch	Australia

== Awards ==
The International Award for Best Feature Film

The International Award for Best Feature Film was won by the Turkish film Jin, directed and written by Reha Erdem.

The Best Documentary Award

The Best Documentary Award was won by the Vietnamese/Australian film Blush of Fruit.

Audience Award

The Audience Award for Most Popular Feature was won by Charlie's Country.

The Audience Award for Most Popular Documentary was won by Once My Mother.

The Audience Award for Most Popular Short was won by The Gallant Captain.

Don Dunstan Award

The Don Dunstan Award was won by Scott Hicks.
