= List of awards and nominations received by Laura Dern =

Laura Dern awards and nominations
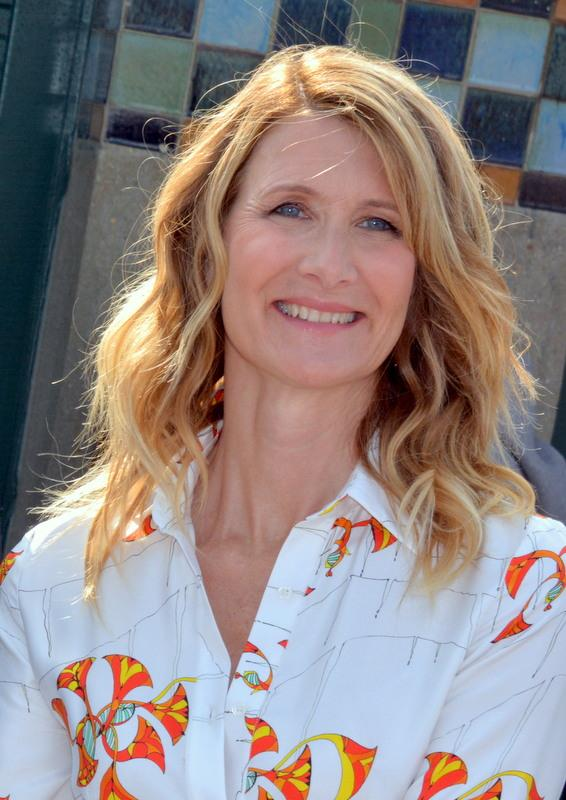
- Dern at the 2017 Deauville American Film Festival
Awards and nominations
Award	Wins	Nominations
Academy Awards	1	3
BAFTAs	1	1
Primetime Emmy Awards	1	9
Golden Globe Awards	5	8
Screen Actors Guild Awards	1	4

Totals (Note: Certain award groups do not simply award one winner. They acknowledge several different recipients, have runners-up, and have third place. Since this is a specific recognition and is different from losing an award, runner-up mentions are considered wins in this award tally. For simplification and to avoid errors, each award in this list has been presumed to have had a prior nomination.)
- Wins: 62
- Nominations: 110

The following is a list of awards and nominations received by American actress Laura Dern. Her competitive honors include an Academy Award from three nominations, a British Academy Film Award, a Primetime Emmy Award from nine nominations, and five Golden Globe Awards from eight nominations.

== Major associations ==
=== Academy Awards ===
1 win out of 3 nominations

Year	Nominated work	Category	Result	Ref.
1992	Rambling Rose	Best Actress	Nominated	
2015	Wild	Best Supporting Actress	Nominated	
2020	Marriage Story	Best Supporting Actress	Won	

=== British Academy Film Awards ===
1 win out of 1 nomination

Year	Nominated work	Category	Result	Ref.
2020	Marriage Story	Best Actress in a Supporting Role	Won	

=== Primetime Emmy Awards ===
1 win out of 9 nominations

Year	Nominated work	Category	Result	Ref.
1992	Afterburn	Outstanding Lead Actress in a Limited Series or Television Movie	Nominated	
1994	Fallen Angels	Outstanding Guest Actress in a Drama Series	Nominated	
1997	Ellen	Outstanding Guest Actress in a Comedy Series	Nominated	
2008	Recount	Outstanding Supporting Actress in a Limited or Anthology Series or Movie	Nominated	
2013	Enlightened	Outstanding Lead Actress in a Comedy Series	Nominated	
2017	Big Little Lies	Outstanding Supporting Actress in a Limited or Anthology Series or Movie	Won	
2018	The Tale	Outstanding Lead Actress in a Limited Series or Television Movie	Nominated	
2020	Big Little Lies	Outstanding Supporting Actress in a Drama Series	Nominated	
2024	Palm Royale	Outstanding Comedy Series	Nominated	

=== Golden Globe Awards ===
5 wins out of 8 nominations

Year	Nominated work	Category	Result	Ref.
1992	Rambling Rose	Best Actress in a Motion Picture – Drama	Nominated	
1993	Afterburn	Best Actress in a Miniseries or Motion Picture – Television	Won	
1999	The Baby Dance	Best Actress in a Miniseries or Motion Picture – Television	Nominated	
2009	Recount	Best Supporting Actress – Series, Miniseries, or Motion Picture Made for Television	Won	
2012	Enlightened	Best Actress in a Television Series – Musical or Comedy	Won	
2018	Big Little Lies	Best Supporting Actress – Series, Miniseries, or Motion Picture Made for Television	Won	
2019	The Tale	Best Actress in a Miniseries or Motion Picture – Television	Nominated	
2020	Marriage Story	Best Supporting Actress – Motion Picture	Won	

=== Screen Actors Guild Awards ===
1 win out of 4 nominations

Year	Nominated work	Category	Result	Ref.
2009	Outstanding Performance by a Female Actor in a Motion Picture Made for Television or Miniseries	Recount	Nominated	
2018	Outstanding Performance by a Female Actor in a Motion Picture Made for Television or Miniseries	Big Little Lies	Nominated	
2020	Outstanding Performance by a Cast in a Television Drama Series	Big Little Lies	Nominated (Note: Shared with the cast.)	
2020	Outstanding Performance by a Female Actor in a Supporting Role in a Motion Picture	Marriage Story	Won	

== Critics' awards ==
=== Alliance of Women Film Journalists ===
Year	Nominated work	Category	Result	Ref.
2020	Marriage Story	Best Supporting Actress	Won	

=== Atlanta Film Critics Circle ===
Year	Nominated work	Category	Result	Ref.
2019	Marriage Story	Best Supporting Actress	Won	

=== Austin Film Critics Association ===
Year	Nominated work	Category	Result	Ref.
2020	Marriage Story	Best Supporting Actress	Nominated	

=== Boston Society of Film Critics ===
Year	Nominated work	Category	Result	Ref.
2004	We Don't Live Here Anymore	Best Supporting Actress	Won	
2014	Wild	Best Supporting Actress	Nominated	
2019	Marriage Story	Best Supporting Actress	Won	

=== Chicago Film Critics Association ===
Year	Nominated work	Category	Result	Ref.
1992	Rambling Rose	Best Actress	Nominated	
2015	Wild	Best Supporting Actress	Nominated	
2019	Marriage Story	Best Supporting Actress	Nominated	

=== Chicago Indie Critics ===
Year	Nominated work	Category	Result	Ref.
2020	Marriage Story	Best Supporting Actress	Nominated	

=== Columbus Film Critics Association ===
Year	Nominated work	Category	Result	Ref.
2020	Marriage Story	Best Supporting Actress	Nominated	

=== Critics' Choice Movie Awards ===
Year	Nominated work	Category	Result	Ref.
2020	Little Women	Best Acting Ensemble	Nominated	
2020	Marriage Story			
2020	Marriage Story	Best Supporting Actress	Won	

=== Critics' Choice Television Awards ===
Year	Nominated work	Category	Result	Ref.
2018	Big Little Lies	Best Supporting Actress in a Movie/Miniseries	Won	
2019	The Tale	Best Actress in a Movie/Miniseries	Nominated	
2020	Big Little Lies	Best Supporting Actress in a Drama Series	Nominated	

=== Dallas–Fort Worth Film Critics Association ===
Year	Nominated work	Category	Result	Ref.
2015	Wild	Best Supporting Actress	Nominated	
2019	Marriage Story	Best Supporting Actress	Won	

=== Denver Film Critics Society ===
Year	Nominated work	Category	Result	Ref.
2020	Marriage Story	Best Supporting Actress (Note: Tied with Florence Pugh for Little Women.)	Won	

=== Detroit Film Critics Society ===
Year	Nominated work	Category	Result	Ref.
2015	Wild	Best Supporting Actress	Nominated	
2019	Marriage Story	Best Supporting Actress	Won	

=== Florida Film Critics Circle ===
Year	Nominated work	Category	Result	Ref.
2019	Marriage Story	Best Supporting Actress	Won	

=== Georgia Film Critics Association ===
Year	Nominated work	Category	Result	Ref.
2020	Marriage Story	Best Supporting Actress	Nominated	

=== Greater Western New York Film Critics Association ===
Year	Nominated work	Category	Result	Ref.
2019	Marriage Story	Best Supporting Actress	Nominated	

=== Hawaii Film Critics Society ===
Year	Nominated work	Category	Result	Ref.
2020	Marriage Story	Best Supporting Actress	Won	

=== Hollywood Critics Association ===
Year	Nominated work	Category	Result	Ref.
2020	Marriage Story	Best Supporting Actress	Nominated	

=== Houston Film Critics Society ===
Year	Nominated work	Category	Result	Ref.
2020	Marriage Story	Best Supporting Actress	Nominated	

=== Indiana Film Journalists Association ===
Year	Nominated work	Category	Result	Ref.
2019	Marriage Story	Best Supporting Actress	Nominated	

=== Indiewire Critics' Poll ===
Year	Nominated work	Category	Result	Ref.
2019	Marriage Story	Best Supporting Actress	Won	

=== Iowa Film Critics Association ===
Year	Nominated work	Category	Result	Ref.
2020	Marriage Story	Best Supporting Actress	Won	

=== Latino Entertainment Journalists Association ===
Year	Nominated work	Category	Result	Ref.
2020	Marriage Story	Best Supporting Actress	Nominated	

=== London Film Critics Circle ===
Year	Nominated work	Category	Result	Ref.
2020	Marriage Story	Supporting Actress of the Year	Won	

=== Los Angeles Film Critics Association ===
Year	Nominated work	Category	Result	Ref.
1985	Mask	New Generation Award	Won	
1985	Smooth Talk	New Generation Award	Won	

=== Music City Film Critics Association ===
Year	Nominated work	Category	Result	Ref.
2020	Marriage Story	Best Supporting Actress	Nominated	

=== National Society of Film Critics ===
Year	Nominated work	Category	Result	Ref.
2007	Inland Empire	Best Actress	Nominated	
2020	Little Women	Best Supporting Actress	Won	
2020	Marriage Story	Best Supporting Actress	Won	

=== New York Film Critics Circle ===
Year	Nominated work	Category	Result	Ref.
2019	Little Women	Best Supporting Actress	Won	
2019	Marriage Story	Best Supporting Actress	Won	

=== New York Film Critics Online ===
Year	Nominated work	Category	Result	Ref.
2019	Marriage Story	Best Supporting Actress	Won	

=== North Carolina Film Critics Association ===
Year	Nominated work	Category	Result	Ref.
2020	Marriage Story	Best Supporting Actress	Nominated	

=== North Dakota Film Society ===
Year	Nominated work	Category	Result	Ref.
2020	Marriage Story	Best Supporting Actress	Won	

=== North Texas Film Critics Association ===
Year	Nominated work	Category	Result	Ref.
2019	Marriage Story	Best Supporting Actress	Runner-up	

=== Oklahoma Film Critics Circle ===
Year	Nominated work	Category	Result	Ref.
2019	Marriage Story	Best Supporting Actress	Runner-up	

=== Online Association of Female Film Critics ===
Year	Nominated work	Category	Result	Ref.
2019	Marriage Story	Best Supporting Actress	Nominated	

=== Online Film Critics Society ===
Year	Nominated work	Category	Result	Ref.
2020	Marriage Story	Best Supporting Actress	Nominated	

=== Phoenix Critics Circle ===
Year	Nominated work	Category	Result	Ref.
2019	Marriage Story	Best Supporting Actress	Nominated	

=== Phoenix Film Critics Society ===
Year	Nominated work	Category	Result	Ref.
2019	Marriage Story	Best Supporting Actress	Won	

=== San Diego Film Critics Society ===
Year	Nominated work	Category	Result	Ref.
2019	Marriage Story	Best Supporting Actress	Runner-up	

=== San Francisco Bay Area Film Critics Circle ===
Year	Nominated work	Category	Result	Ref.
2019	Marriage Story	Best Supporting Actress	Nominated	

=== Seattle Film Critics Society ===
Year	Nominated work	Category	Result	Ref.
2019	Marriage Story	Best Supporting Actress	Nominated	

=== Southeastern Film Critics Association ===
Year	Nominated work	Category	Result	Ref.
2019	Marriage Story	Best Supporting Actress	Won	

=== St. Louis Film Critics Association ===
Year	Nominated work	Category	Result	Ref.
2019	Marriage Story	Best Supporting Actress	Runner-up	

=== Toronto Film Critics Association ===
Year	Nominated work	Category	Result	Ref.
2019	Marriage Story	Best Supporting Actress	Won	

=== Vancouver Film Critics Circle ===
Year	Nominated work	Category	Result	Ref.
2014	Wild	Best Supporting Actress	Nominated	
2019	Marriage Story	Best Supporting Actress	Won	

=== Washington D.C. Area Film Critics Association ===
Year	Nominated work	Category	Result	Ref.
2014	Wild	Best Supporting Actress	Nominated	
2019	Marriage Story	Best Supporting Actress	Nominated	

== Other associations ==
=== AARP's Movies for Grown-Up Awards ===
Year	Nominated work	Category	Result	Ref.
2020	Marriage Story	Best Supporting Actress	Won	
2026	Is This Thing On?	Best Actress	Won	

=== CableACE Awards ===
Year	Nominated work	Category	Result	Ref.
1993	Afterburn	Best Actress in a Miniseries or a TV Movie	Nominated	
1995	Down Came a Blackbird	Best Actress in a Miniseries or a TV Movie	Nominated	

=== Capri Hollywood International Film Festival ===
Year	Nominated work	Category	Result	Ref.
2025	Jay Kelly	Capri Ensemble Cast Award (Note: Shared with George Clooney, Billy Crudup, Adam Sandler, Alba Rohrwacher and Giovanni Esposito)	Won	

=== Dingle International Film Festival ===
Year	Nominated work	Category	Result	Ref.
2014	Career Achievement	Gregory Peck Award for Cinematic Excellence	Awarded	

=== Dorian Awards ===
Year	Nominated work	Category	Result	Ref.
2020	Marriage Story	Supporting Film Performance of the Year — Actress	Nominated	

=== Gold Derby Television Awards ===
Year	Nominated work	Category	Result	Ref.
2017	Big Little Lies	Best Miniseries/TV Movie Supporting Actress	Won	
2018	The Tale	Best Miniseries/TV Movie Actress	Won	

=== Hollywood Film Awards ===
Year	Nominated work	Category	Result	Ref.
2019	Marriage Story	Hollywood Supporting Actress Award	Won	

=== Hollywood Foreign Press Association ===
Year	Nominated work	Category	Result	Ref.
1982	—N/a	Miss Golden Globe	Won	

=== Hollywood Walk of Fame ===
Year	Nominated work	Category	Result	Ref.
2010	—N/a	Star – Motion Pictures	Won	

=== Independent Spirit Awards ===
Year	Nominated work	Category	Result	Ref.
1986	Smooth Talk	Best Female Lead	Nominated	
1987	Blue Velvet	Best Female Lead	Nominated	
2007	—N/a	Special Distinction Award (Note: Shared with David Lynch.)	Won	
2020	Marriage Story	Robert Altman Award	Won	

=== Montreal World Film Festival ===
Year	Nominated work	Category	Result	Ref.
1991	Rambling Rose	Best Actress	Won	
1996	Citizen Ruth	Best Actress	Won	

=== Satellite Awards ===
Year	Nominated work	Category	Result	Ref.
1997	The Siege at Ruby Ridge	Best Performance by a Lead Actress in a Miniseries or Motion Picture – Television	Nominated	
2008	Recount	Best Performance by a Supporting Actress in a Series, Miniseries, or Motion Picture – Television	Nominated	
2012	Enlightened	Best Performance by a Lead Actress in a Television Series – Comedy or Musical	Nominated	
2014	Enlightened	Best Performance by a Lead Actress in a Television Series – Comedy or Musical	Nominated	
2015	Wild	Best Performance by a Supporting Actress in a Motion Picture – Drama	Nominated	
2018	Big Little Lies	Best Performance by a Supporting Actress in a Series, Miniseries, or Motion Picture – Television	Nominated	
2019	Marriage Story	Best Performance by a Supporting Actress in a Motion Picture – Drama	Nominated	

=== Saturn Awards ===
Year	Nominated work	Category	Result	Ref.
1994	Jurassic Park	Best Film Lead Actress	Nominated	

=== Sundance Film Festival ===
Year	Nominated work	Category	Result	Ref.
1999	—N/a	Independent Vision Award	Won	
