= Stoker (film) =

2013 film by Park Chan-wook

- Theatrical release poster
- Directed by: Park Chan-wook
- Written by: Wentworth Miller
- Produced by: Ridley Scott; Tony Scott; Michael Costigan
- Starring: Mia Wasikowska; Matthew Goode; Nicole Kidman; Dermot Mulroney; Jacki Weaver
- Cinematography: Chung-hoon Chung
- Edited by: Nicolas De Toth
- Music by: Clint Mansell
- Production companies: Indian Paintbrush; Scott Free Productions
- Distributed by: Fox Searchlight Pictures
- Release dates: 20 January 2013 (Sundance); 1 March 2013 (United States)
- Running time: 99 minutes
- Countries: United Kingdom; United States
- Language: English
- Budget: $12 million
- Box office: $12.1 million

Stoker is a 2013 Southern Gothic coming-of-age psychological thriller film directed by Park Chan-wook, in his English-language debut, and written by Wentworth Miller. The film stars Mia Wasikowska, Matthew Goode, Nicole Kidman, Dermot Mulroney, and Jacki Weaver.

Stoker had its world premiere at the Sundance Film Festival on 20 January 2013, and was theatrically released in the United States on 1 March 2013, by Fox Searchlight Pictures.

== Plot ==
On her 18th birthday, India Stoker, a girl with a strong acuteness of the senses, is left with her unstable mother Evelyn after her loving father Richard dies in a car crash. At Richard's funeral, Evelyn and India are introduced to Richard's charismatic younger brother Charlie, who has spent his life traveling the world. India, who did not know Charlie existed, is perturbed by his presence. He announces that he is staying indefinitely to help support India and Evelyn, to Evelyn's delight and India's chagrin.

India witnesses Charlie argue with Mrs. McGarrick, the head caretaker of the house. Mrs. McGarrick complains to Charlie that she has been his "eyes and ears" since he was a boy. Mrs. McGarrick then disappears. Charlie and Evelyn grow close while India continues to rebuff his attempts to befriend her. India's great-aunt Gwendolyn visits the family, to Evelyn and Charlie's dismay. Gwendolyn shows surprise at Charlie's claims of traveling the world and tells Evelyn that she needs to talk to her about Charlie. Gwendolyn changes hotels due to an unexplained fear and suspicion of Charlie. She loses her cell phone and tries to call the Stokers' home from a phone booth, but Charlie arrives and strangles her to death with his belt. Meanwhile, India discovers Mrs. McGarrick's body in the freezer and realizes Charlie is a murderer.

At school, India stabs a bully, Chris Pitts, in the hand with a pencil after he tries to land a punch to her head. This draws the attention of another classmate, Whip Taylor. One night, after witnessing Evelyn and Charlie kiss, India wanders off to a local diner where she runs into Whip. She and Whip go into the woods, and as they make out, India bites his tongue. Whip attempts to rape India before Charlie intervenes and breaks Whip's neck with his belt while Whip's body lies on top of India. India aids Charlie in burying the body in her garden. She attempts to call Gwendolyn, but hears her phone ring in the garden, realizing Charlie killed her too. While showering, India masturbates to the memory of the murder, climaxing as she remembers Charlie breaking Whip's neck.

While going through Richard's office, India discovers that a key she received as a birthday present belongs to a locked drawer of Richard's desk. Inside, she finds dozens of letters Charlie wrote to her over the years, which detail his travels and his love for his niece, although they have never met. However, she sees that the sending address is a mental institution. She confronts Charlie, who explains the truth: Charlie killed his and Richard's younger brother Jonathan as a child by burying him alive in a sandbox because he was jealous that Richard paid more attention to him. He was then put in a mental institution. When released on India's 18th birthday, Richard gave Charlie a car, money, and an apartment in New York City on the condition that he stay away from Richard's family. Feeling hurt and betrayed, Charlie bludgeoned Richard to death with a rock and staged the car accident.

India is shocked and angered. Charlie gives her a birthday present, a pair of stiletto heels, to replace her more childish saddle shoes. When Sheriff Howard stops by to question India about Whip's disappearance, Charlie provides an alibi for her. Shortly after India agrees to leave for New York with Charlie, Evelyn witnesses them together. That night, Evelyn coldly expresses her desire to watch India suffer before confronting Charlie, implying that she knows the truth about Richard's death and Charlie's institutionalization. Charlie seduces Evelyn and then attempts to strangle her with a belt, but India fatally shoots him with her rifle.

The next morning, India buries Charlie's body in the backyard, then leaves for New York in his car. She is pulled over for speeding by Sheriff Howard, who asks her why she is in a hurry. She replies that she wanted to catch his attention, before stabbing him in the neck with a pair of pruning shears. She pursues the bleeding sheriff into a field and shoots him with her rifle.

== Cast ==
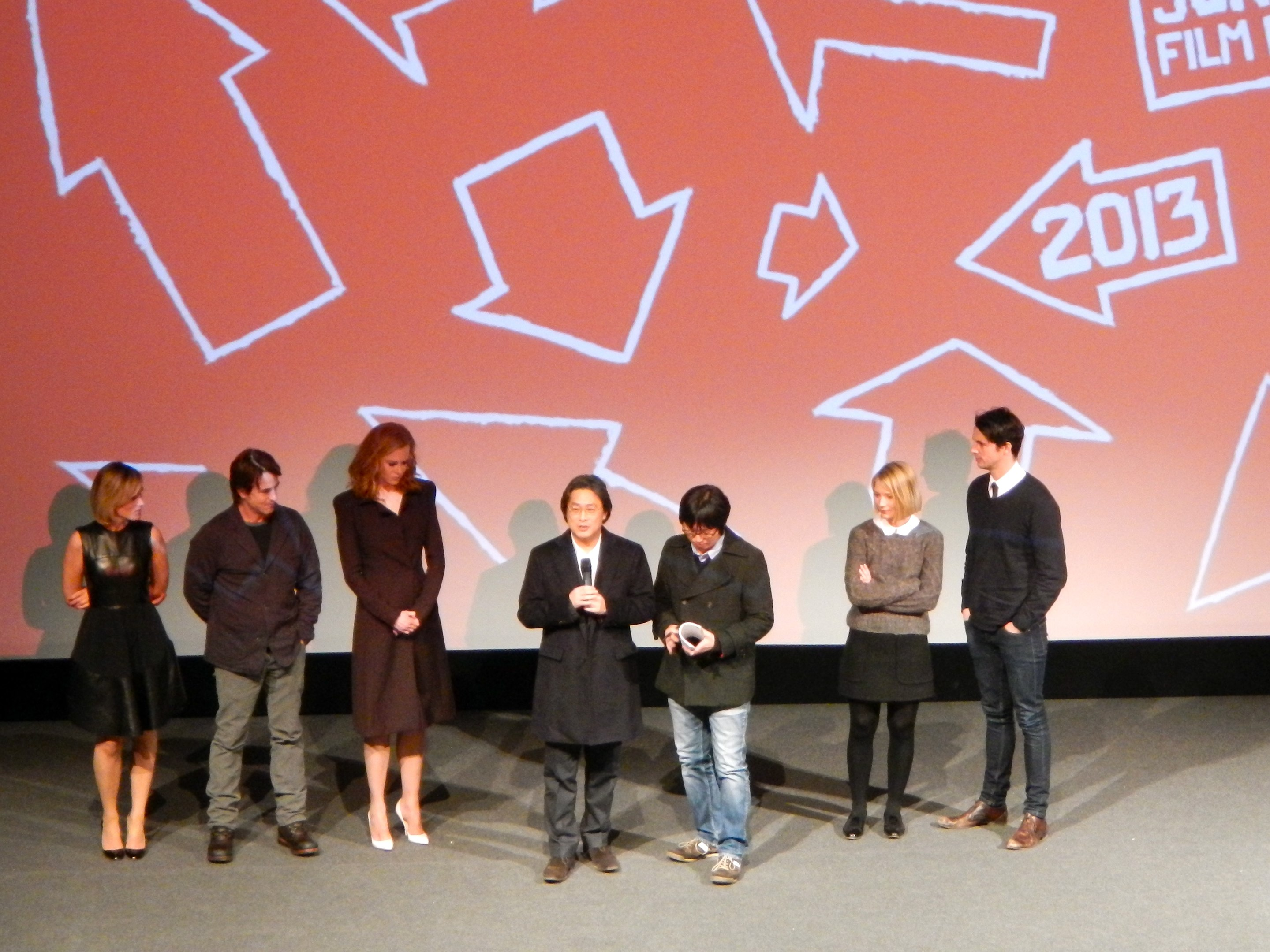
The cast with the director at Sundance

- Mia Wasikowska as India Stoker
- Matthew Goode as Charlie Stoker
- Nicole Kidman as Evelyn Stoker
- Dermot Mulroney as Richard Stoker
- Jacki Weaver as Gwendolyn "Gin" Stoker
- Phyllis Somerville as Mrs. McGarrick
- Alden Ehrenreich as Whip Taylor
- Lucas Till as Chris Pitts
- Ralph Brown as Sheriff Howard
- Judith Godrèche as Doctor Jacquin
- Harmony Korine as Mr. Feldman

== Production ==
Wentworth Miller, mostly known as an actor, wrote the screenplay for Stoker, as well as a prequel, Uncle Charlie. He used the pseudonym Ted Foulke for submitting his work, later explaining "I just wanted the scripts to sink or swim on their own." On the 2010 Black List, a list of the best unproduced screenplays then making the rounds in Hollywood, Stoker finished in the top 10. Miller described it as a "horror film, a family drama and a psychological thriller". Although influenced by Bram Stoker's Dracula, Miller clarified that Stoker was "not about vampires. It was never meant to be about vampires but it is a horror story. A stoker is one who stokes, which also ties in nicely with the narrative." Alfred Hitchcock's Shadow of a Doubt also influenced the film. Miller said: "The jumping-off point is actually Hitchcock's Shadow of a Doubt. So, that's where we begin, and then we take it in a very, very different direction."

The film marked director Park Chan-wook's English-language debut. In January 2011, it was reported that Mia Wasikowska was in negotiations to play India, and in February, Nicole Kidman also entered negotiations to join the cast. Back in June 2010, before Wasikowska and Kidman were ultimately cast, both Carey Mulligan and Jodie Foster were reported to be in talks to star in the film. In June 2011, it was reported that Matthew Goode was in talks to play Charlie, after Colin Firth, who was attached earlier, had to drop out. Jacki Weaver, Lucas Till, Alden Ehrenreich, Ralph Brown and Dermot Mulroney joined the cast in July and August 2011.

Filming took 40 days beginning in Nashville, Tennessee, in September 2011. The motel scenes were filmed in nearby Murfreesboro on 22 September, and additional scenes were shot in Sewanee, home of the University of the South. Principal photography wrapped on 23 October. The film is dedicated to the memory of producer Tony Scott, who died after production wrapped.

== Music ==
Composer Philip Glass was originally hired to compose the film's score but was replaced by Clint Mansell. Two of Glass's compositions for piano are still included in the finished film however, as revealed in the movie credits.

== Hitchcock influence ==
In addition to screenwriter Wentworth Miller stating that the film was influenced by Shadow of a Doubt, there are a number of Hitchcock's themes, plot devices and motifs used within it. Both Matthew Goode's character and Joseph Cotten's character in Shadow of a Doubt share the name "Uncle Charlie", as well as Hitchcock's use of the likeable criminal. The complex relationship that develops between Uncle Charlie and India alludes to Hitchcock's use of the double, with the young Charlie and Uncle Charlie in Shadow of a Doubt. Many of Uncle Charlie and India's key interactions occur on a staircase, which is a Hitchcock motif also used in Shadow of a Doubt. There is a pivotal scene in Stoker that takes place near a train track and the rumbling train makes an aural intrusion, which plays into Hitchcock's use of trains as a sexual euphemism.

== Release ==
=== Critical reception ===
On the review aggregator website Rotten Tomatoes, 70% of 204 critics' reviews are positive, with an average rating of 6.7/10. The website's consensus reads: "Its script doesn't quite carry the dramatic heft of his earlier work, but Park Chan-wook's Stoker showcases his eye for sumptuous imagery and his affection for dark, atmospheric narratives populated by mysterious characters." Metacritic, which uses a weighted average, assigned the film a score of 58 out of 100, based on 42 critics, indicating "mixed or average" reviews.

The film premiered at Sundance and the reviews were mostly positive. In The Guardian, critic Jeremy Kay called the film "a gorgeously mounted family mystery dressed up as a gothic fairytale", and said the film presents viewers with clues worthy of Hitchcock: "Literary references and symbolism abound in Stoker. You can get tied up trying to figure out who is what. That is the idea. All the clues are there. You just have to look closely." The Guardian awarded Stoker four out of five stars in its review.

Richard Roeper of Chicago Sun-Times gave the film 3.5 out of 4, calling it "disturbingly good". Peter Travers from Rolling Stone gave it 3 out of 4, and called it a "thriller of savage beauty". Writing for Variety, Guy Lodge praised the film, calling it "a splendidly demented gumbo of Hitchcock thriller".

Brian Moylan of Hollywood.com praised the performances of Nicole Kidman and Matthew Goode saying "Kidman is at her finest as a disinterested mother. She shows fear and disdain in the most subtle ways, never overplaying a character that could turn into a campy arch villain with just the tiniest bit of scene-chewing. And Goode is the most menacing of all, the malevolent force that hides behind the facade not only of normalcy but of something attractive that you know is incredibly dangerous."

Not all reviews were positive; David Thomson, writing for The New Republic, said that "Stoker trembles between the portentous and the ridiculous, and I think you know which one is going to win." In addition, Josh Slater-Williams of The Skinny labelled the film a "relentless, hollow mess".

Andrew Chan of the Film Critics Circle of Australia writes, "Stoker is constantly engaging, suitably intense, certainly different, always suspenseful and even stylishly directed, but it is not Oldboy".

Kidman's performance as Evie was included on TribecaFilm.com as one of the year's most underrated performances. The author claimed "Kidman exploits Evelyn’s fragility with her every glance and gesture. Kidman as Evelyn radiates a strange kind of unnerving elegance."

Empire ranked it No. 6 on its list of Best Movies of 2013.

=== Accolades ===
Year	Award	Category	Recipient	Result
2013	Online Film & Television Association Awards	Best Titles Sequence		Nominated
2013	Golden Trailer Awards	Best Thriller		Nominated
2013	Golden Trailer Awards	Best Original Trailer		Nominated
2013	Fright Meter Awards	Best Screenplay	Wentworth Miller	Nominated
2013	Fright Meter Awards	Best Director	Park Chan-wook	Nominated
2013	Fright Meter Awards	Best Editing	Nicolas De Toth	Nominated
2013	Fright Meter Awards	Best Cinematography	Chung Chung-hoon	Nominated
2013	Fright Meter Awards	Best Actress	Mia Wasikowska	Nominated
2013	Fright Meter Awards	Best Actor	Matthew Goode	Nominated
2013	Fright Meter Awards	Best Supporting Actress	Nicole Kidman	Nominated
2013	Fright Meter Awards	Best Ensemble Cast		Nominated
2014	Central Ohio Film Critics Association Awards	Best Overlooked Film		Nominated
2014	London Film Critics' Circle Awards	Technical Achievement	Kurt Swanson, Bart Mueller (for costumes)	Nominated
2014	Saturn Awards	Best International Film		Nominated
2014	Saturn Awards	Best Actress	Mia Wasikowska	Nominated
2014	Saturn Awards	Best Supporting Actress	Nicole Kidman	Nominated
2014	Fangoria Chainsaw Awards	Best Leading Actress	Mia Wasikowska	Third
2014	Fangoria Chainsaw Awards	Best Supporting Actor	Matthew Goode	Won
2014	Fangoria Chainsaw Awards	Best Screenplay	Wentworth Miller	Runner-up
2014	Fangoria Chainsaw Awards	Best Limited-Release/Direct-to-Video Film		Runner-up
2014	Empire Awards	Best Supporting Actress	Mia Wasikowska	Nominated

=== Home media ===
The film was released on DVD and Blu-ray Disc on 18 June 2013.
