= Bety Reis =

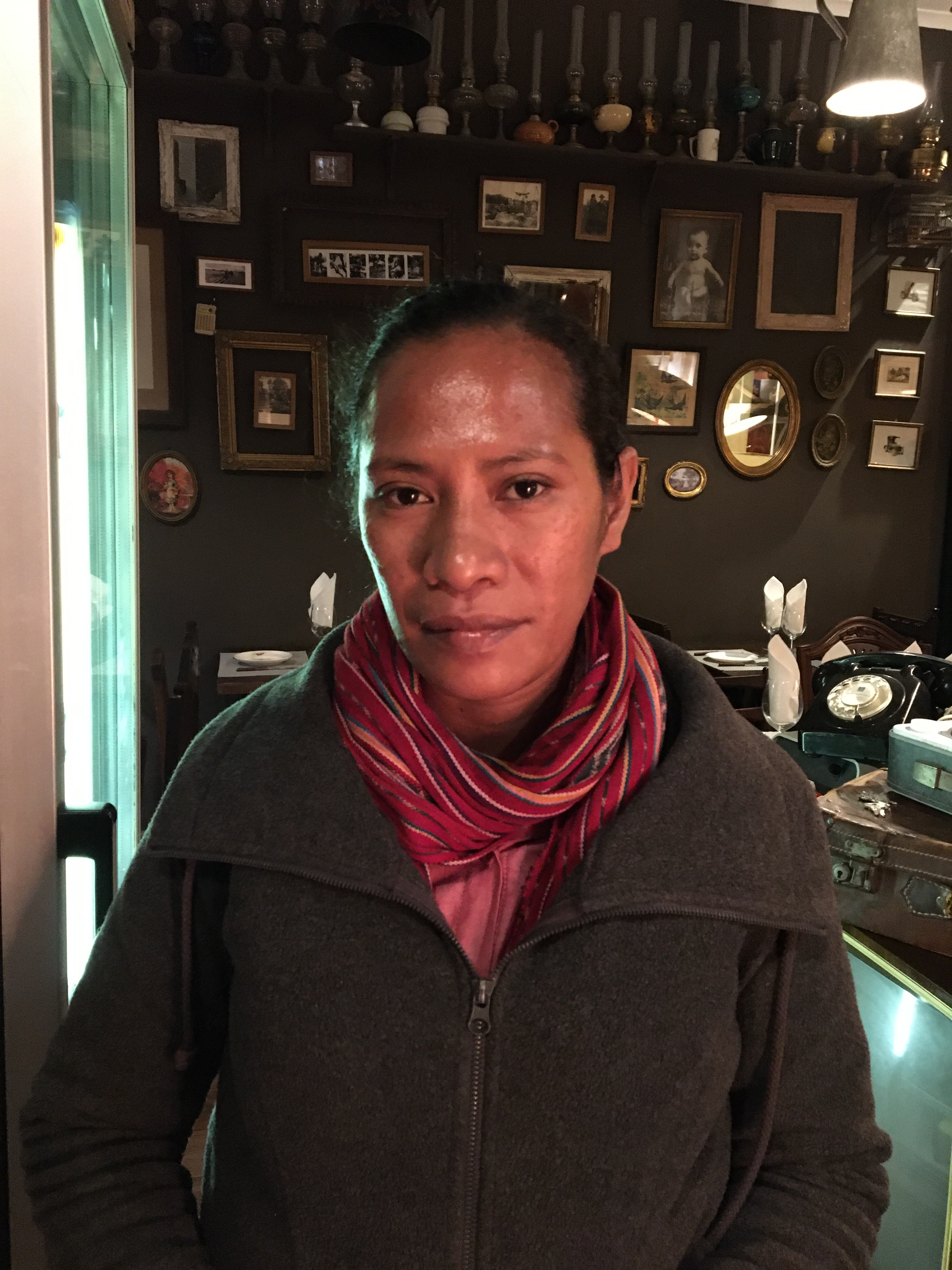
- Born: Nívea Elisabeth C. dos Reis; 1 March 1983 (age 42); East Timor
- Occupation(s): actress, film director, producer
- Children: 1

Nívea Elisabeth C. dos Reis (born 1 March 1983), known professionally as Bety Reis, is an East Timorese actress, director and film producer.

== Career ==
Reis grew up in East Timor, which was occupied by Indonesia until 1999. She addressed the impressions of the conflict in most of her films. After the Indonesians left, Reis was a member of the Bibi Bulak theater group. She was a cast consultant for the Australian film Balibo, which was shot in East Timor. Since 2010, she has been the director of Dili Film Works for film and television productions. With this company she also produced her following works. In 2010, the first East Timorese telenovela Wehali appeared, in which Reis also played a role. In 2013, she was co-director of the first East Timorese feature film Beatriz's War. She also played the role of Beatriz's mother. In 2017, Reis produced the documentary Abdul & José (Portuguese A Criança Roubada). In the same year, the telenovela Laloran Justisa, produced by Dili Film Works, was created. Reis has also made a number of short films.

Reis has a daughter.

== Awards ==
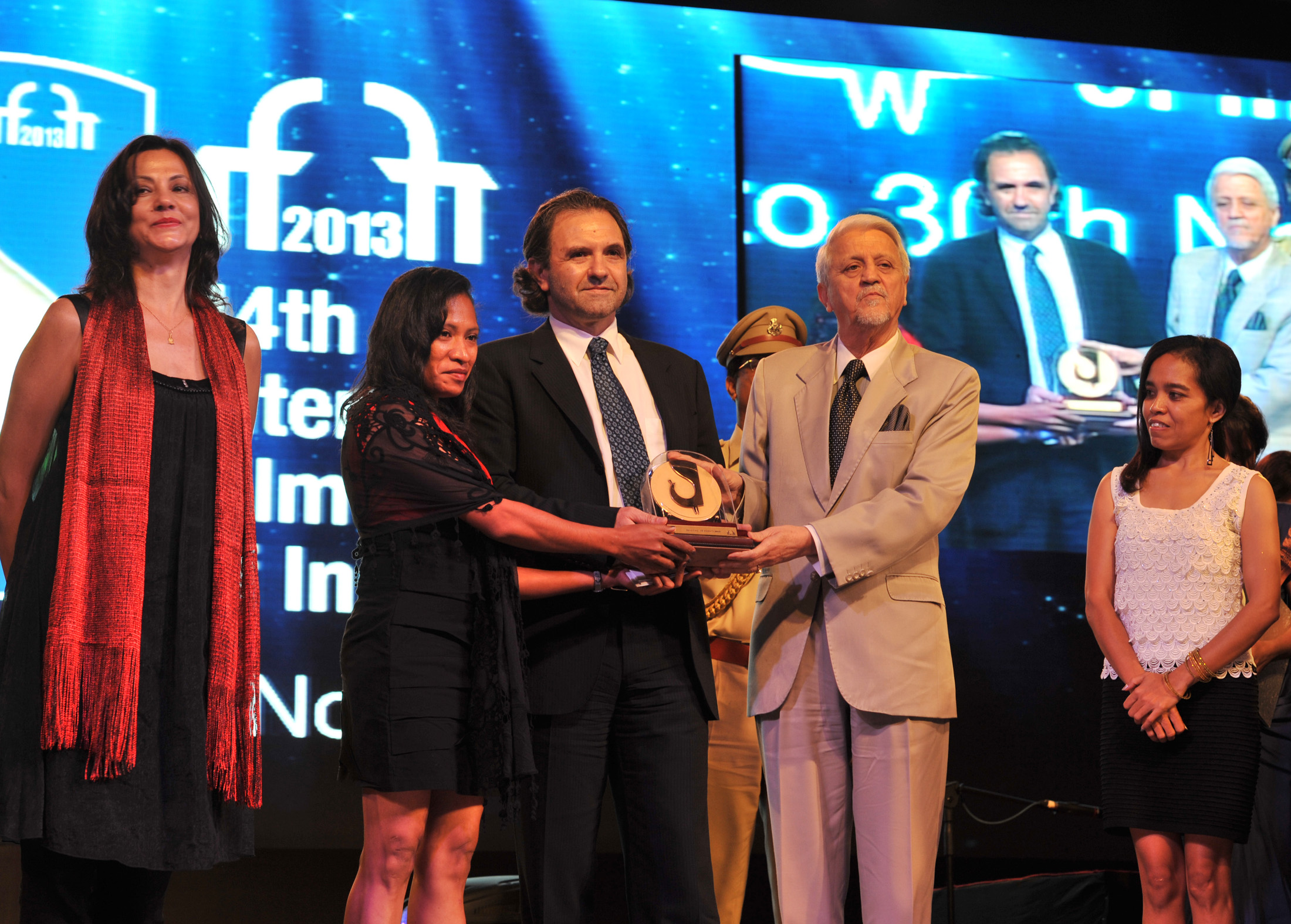
Presentation of the Golden Peacock to Bety Reis and Luigi Acquisito.

Beatriz's War received the 2013 Golden Peacock Award in the category of best film at the 44th International Film Festival of India.
