= Beatriz's War =

2013 film

- Directed by: Luigi Acquisto; Bety Reis
- Written by: Luigi Acquisto; Irim Tolentino
- Produced by: Luigi Acquisto; Lurdes Pires; Stella Zammataro
- Starring: Irim Tolentino; Augusta Soares; José da Costa
- Cinematography: Valeriu Campan
- Edited by: Nick Calpakdjian
- Music by: Osme Gonsalves; Jamie Saxe
- Production companies: Dili Film Works; FairTrade Films
- Release date: 17 September 2013
- Running time: 105 minutes
- Country: East Timor
- Languages: Tetum; Indonesian
- Budget: $200,000 AUD

Beatriz's War (Portuguese: A Guerra da Beatriz) is a 2013 drama film directed by Luigi Acquisto and Bety Reis. It is the first full-length feature film to be produced by East Timor. Its premiere was on 17 September 2013 in Dili. The film was shown in the first month to 30,000 East Timorese at outdoor screenings. It was screened at the 2013 Adelaide Film Festival. It won Golden Peacock (Best Film) at the 44th International Film Festival of India.

== Plot ==
The film is based on the story of Martin Guerre in 16th-century France, transplanted into the setting of East Timor during the Indonesian occupation. The film revolves around the life of a young East Timorese woman named Beatriz. The story begins with Beatriz meeting her future husband, Tomas, as children. The two marry young and soon after their wedding the Indonesian invasion of East Timor begins. Beatriz fights for her true love and her country.

== Cast ==
- Irim Tolentino as Beatriz: a young Timorese woman who joins the resistance struggle against the Indonesian occupation
  - Sandra da Costa as young Beatriz
- Augusta Soares as Teresa: Tomas' sister who, at Beatriz's urging, becomes Sumitro's wife
  - Doretea Soares as young Teresa
- José da Costa as Tomás dos Anjos: Beatriz's husband who is arrested by Indonesian forces and disappears
  - Eugenio Soares as young Tomás
  - Raimundo dos Santos as 19-year-old Tomás
- Osme Gonsalves as Father Nicolau: a sympathetic Catholic priest
- Gaspar Sarmento as Captain Sumitro: an Indonesian officer in charge of Kraras village
- Funu Lakan as Celestino dos Anjos: Tomás' father and a Falintil guerrilla
- Bety Reis as Estela: Beatriz's mother
- Newtom Varudo Filipe as an Indonesian army captain
- Evangelina Soares Gama as Kemala: Sumitro and Teresa's daughter
- Nazarello Martins as Celestino Jr.: Tomás and Beatriz's son
