= Mia Wasikowska =

Australian actress (born 1989)

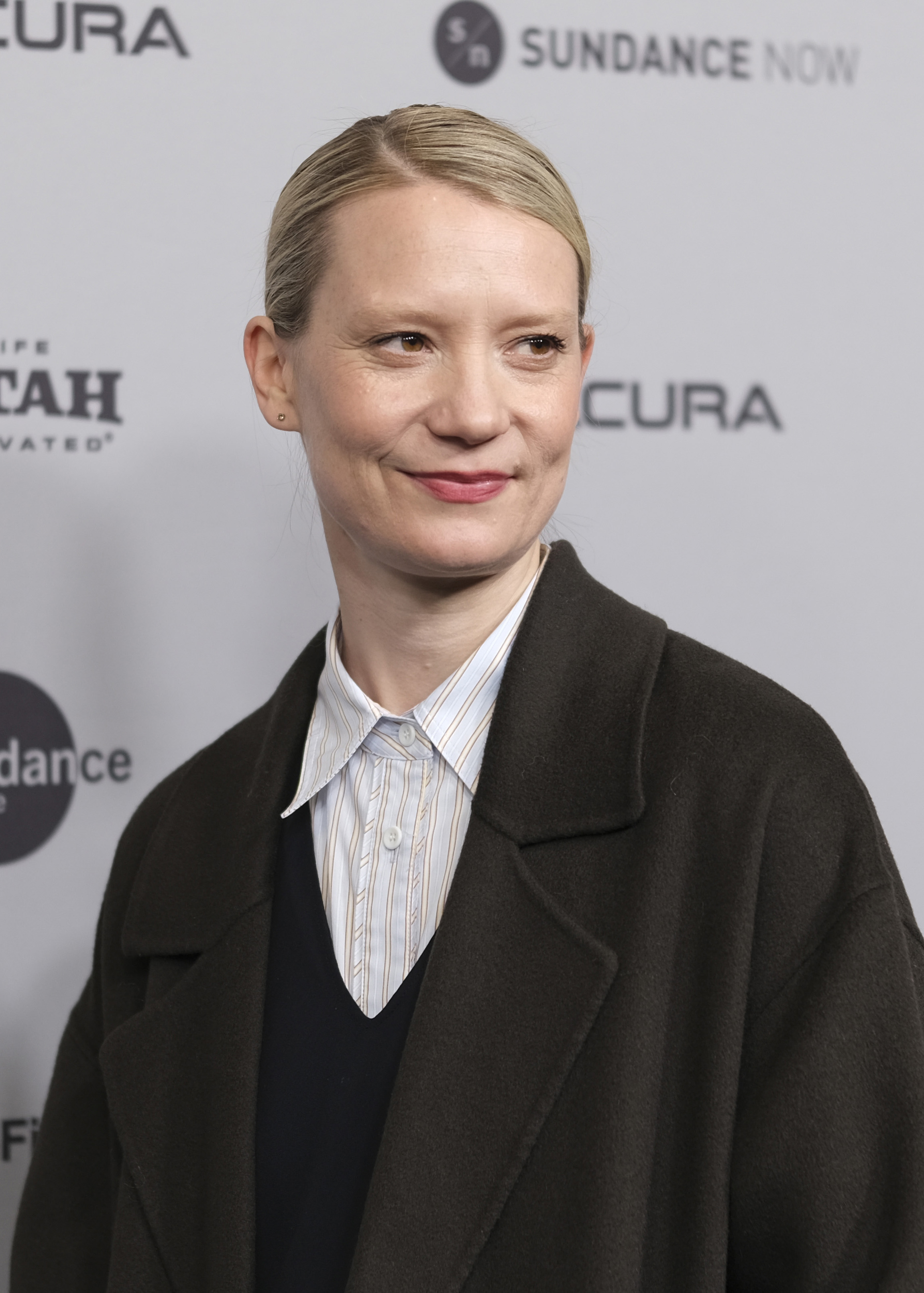
- Wasikowska in 2026
- Born: 25 October 1989 (age 37); Canberra, Australia
- Occupation: Actress
- Years active: 2004–present

Mia Wasikowska (/ˌvʌʃɪˈkɒfskə/ VU-shi-KOF-skə; born 25 October 1989) is an Australian actress. She made her screen debut on the Australian television drama All Saints in 2004, followed by her feature film debut in Suburban Mayhem (2006). She first became known to a wider audience following her critically acclaimed work on the HBO television series In Treatment (2008). She was nominated for the Independent Spirit Award for Best Supporting Female for the film That Evening Sun (2009).

Wasikowska gained worldwide recognition in 2010 after starring as Alice in Tim Burton's Alice in Wonderland and appearing in the comedy-drama film The Kids Are All Right. She starred in Cary Fukunaga's Jane Eyre (2011), Gus Van Sant's Restless (2011), Park Chan-wook's Stoker (2013), Jim Jarmusch's Only Lovers Left Alive (2013), John Curran's Tracks (2013), Richard Ayoade's The Double (2013), David Cronenberg's Maps to the Stars (2014), and Guillermo del Toro's Crimson Peak (2015). In 2016, she reprised her role as Alice in the film Alice Through the Looking Glass, and has since appeared in a number of independent films, including Damsel (2018), Judy and Punch (2019), Bergman Island (2021), and Leviticus (2026).

== Early life ==
Wasikowska was born Mia Reid Wasikowska on 25 October 1989 in Canberra, Australia. She attended Cook Primary School, Ainslie Primary School and Canberra High School, and Karabar High School in Queanbeyan, which neighbours Canberra. She has an older sister, Jess, and a younger brother, Kai. Her mother, Marzena Wasikowska, is a Polish photographer, while her father, John Reid, is an Australian photographer and collagist. In 1998, when she was eight years old, Wasikowska and her family moved to Szczecin, Poland for a year, after her mother received a grant to produce a collection of work based on her own experience of emigrating from Poland to Australia in 1974 at the age of 11. Wasikowska and her siblings took part in the production as subjects; she explained to Johanna Schneller of The Globe and Mail in July 2010, "We never had to smile or perform. We weren't always conscious of being photographed. We'd just do our thing, and she'd take pictures of us."

At the age of nine, Wasikowska began studying ballet with Jackie Hallahan at the Canberra Dance Development Centre, with hopes of going professional. She began dancing en pointe at thirteen, and was training 35 hours a week in addition to attending school full-time. Her daily routine consisted of leaving school in the early afternoon and dancing until nine o'clock at night. A spur on her heel hampered her dancing. Her passion for ballet also waned due to the increasing pressure to achieve physical perfection and her growing dissatisfaction with that world in general, and she quit at the age of fourteen. However, she credits ballet with improving her ability to handle her nerves in auditions.

At the same time, she had been exposed to European and Australian cinema at an early age, and was particularly moved by Krzysztof Kieślowski's Three Colours trilogy and Gillian Armstrong's My Brilliant Career. Although shy and averse to performing during her school years, she was inspired to try to break into acting after seeing Holly Hunter in The Piano and Gena Rowlands in A Woman Under the Influence. She felt acting in film was a way to explore human imperfections. She looked up twelve Australian talent agencies on the Internet and contacted them all, but received only one response. Despite her lack of acting experience, she arranged a meeting after persistent callbacks.

== Career ==
=== 2005–2009: Early work ===
Wasikowska landed her first acting role in 2004 with a two-episode stint on the Australian drama series All Saints. She had just turned 15 when she was cast in her Australian film debut, Suburban Mayhem (2006), for which she was nominated for a Young Actor's AFI Award. That year she also appeared in her first short film, Lens Love Story, in which she had no dialogue.

In 2007, Wasikowska appeared in the crocodile horror film Rogue, alongside Radha Mitchell and Sam Worthington. She observed quietly on the set; fellow actor Stephen Curry noted, "We didn't hear a peep out of her for three weeks, which earned her the nickname of 'Rowdy'". She beat nearly 200 other actresses for a part in the drama September (2007) when she was cast on the spot by director Peter Carstairs following her audition. She starred in Spencer Susser's acclaimed short film I Love Sarah Jane, which premiered at the 2008 Sundance Film Festival.

At the age of seventeen, Wasikowska received her first big break role in the United States when she was cast as Sophie, a suicidal gymnast, in HBO's acclaimed weekly drama In Treatment; she auditioned for the role by videotape. The part required her to leave school in Canberra and move to Los Angeles for three months, while enrolling in correspondence courses. She earned critical acclaim for her performance as the troubled teenager treated by psychotherapist Paul Weston (Gabriel Byrne), which included praise for her American accent. She revealed in an October 2008 interview with Variety that she was something of a mimic as a child, and that the widely available American films and TV shows in Australia made it easier for Australians to learn to speak like Americans.

This show enabled Wasikowska to gain roles in American films. She played Chaya, the young wife of Asael Bielski (Jamie Bell) in Defiance (2008). Director Edward Zwick cast her, explaining to the Australian edition of Vogue, "Her inner life is so vivid that it comes across even when she's being still." Her next role was as aviation pioneer Elinor Smith in Mira Nair's 2009 biopic Amelia. In June 2008, for her work on In Treatment, she received an Australians in Film Breakthrough Award.

Wasikowska played the supporting role of Pamela Choat in the 2009 Southern Gothic independent film That Evening Sun opposite Hal Holbrook. Director Scott Teems, seeking a young actress who bore a resemblance to Sissy Spacek, initially balked at the casting director's suggestion of Wasikowska for the role. He wanted to cast all native Southerners for the sake of authenticity. However, after auditions with other actresses were unsuccessful, Teems relented and summoned Wasikowska for an audition. During the two hours she had to prepare, she watched Coal Miner's Daughter online to quickly learn a Southern accent, and impressed Teems enough to be the only non-American actor in the film. She was nominated for a 2009 Independent Spirit Award for Best Supporting Female, and the film received a South by Southwest award for Best Ensemble Cast.

=== 2010–2016: Breakthrough and critical acclaim ===
In July 2008, Wasikowska was cast as the eponymous heroine in Tim Burton's version of Alice in Wonderland, alongside Johnny Depp, Anne Hathaway and Helena Bonham Carter. She sent a videotaped audition to casting directors in London, and her first live reading in Los Angeles occurred on the same day as her Evening Sun audition. After three more auditions in London, she was given the role. Burton cited her "old-soul quality" as a catalyst in casting her: "Because you're witnessing this whole thing through her eyes, it needed somebody who can subtly portray that."

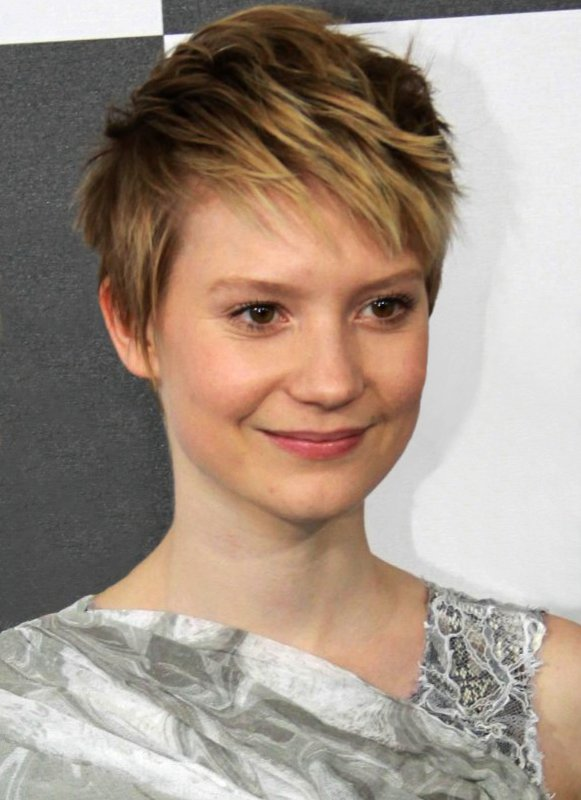
Wasikowska at the Independent Spirit Awards on 5 March 2010

Wasikowska portrayed a nineteen-year-old Alice returning to Wonderland for the first time in over a decade after falling down a rabbit hole from an unwanted marriage proposal. Her affinity for the character played a part in her desire for the role, as she had read the Lewis Carroll books as a child and was a fan of Jan Švankmajer's 1988 stop-motion film Alice. She considered Burton's film as a chance to explore a deeper characterisation of Alice, to whom she felt young women her age could relate, saying: "Alice has a certain discomfort within herself, within society and among her peers; I [...] have definitely felt similarly about all of those things, so I could really understand her not fitting in. Alice also [is] an observer who is thinking a lot, and that's similar to how I am."

For Lisa Cholodenko's indie comedy The Kids Are All Right, Wasikowska was cast as Joni, the bookish daughter of a lesbian couple (Annette Bening and Julianne Moore) who was conceived via artificial insemination. At her younger brother's (Josh Hutcherson) request, she seeks out their biological father (Mark Ruffalo). During shooting, she successfully campaigned to have Joni wear pajamas in several home scenes. She explained to Orlando Sentinel film critic Roger Moore, "[Joni's] very comfortable in her place, with who she is. So I pushed to have her, whenever she was at home, in her pajamas. That's comfortable! And that's something I do."

On 25 October, Wasikowska was honored with the Hollywood Awards' Breakthrough Actress Award, which was presented to her by Bryce Dallas Howard, and she won the Australian Film Institute International Award for Best Actress on 12 December for her performance in Alice in Wonderland. According to Forbes, Alice in Wonderland was amongst the highest-grossing films of 2010 with $1.025 billion. As of May 2022, it is the 44th-highest-grossing film of all time.

From March to May 2010, Wasikowska filmed Cary Fukunaga's adaptation of Jane Eyre, in which she starred as the title character opposite Michael Fassbender as Mr. Rochester. She began reading the novel after completion of Alice in Wonderland, during which she asked her agent if a script existed. Two months later, she received a script and was asked to meet with Fukunaga Fukunaga was unfamiliar with her work and was undecided about casting her, so he sought the opinion of director Gus Van Sant, who had worked with Wasikowska on his 2011 film Restless. Fukunaga told BlackBook magazine in February 2011, "Gus wrote back: 'Cast her.'" Due to a scheduling conflict, she had to withdraw from the lead in Julia Leigh's 2011 Australian independent film Sleeping Beauty, and she was replaced by Emily Browning.

Wasikowska appeared in Restless (2011), which was filmed from November to December 2009. The portrayal of her character, a terminally ill sixteen-year-old, required her to crop her long hair. From December 2010 to February 2011, Wasikowska filmed Rodrigo García's Albert Nobbs, for which she was a last-minute replacement for Amanda Seyfried.

On 21 April 2011, Wasikowska was named in the Time 100, a listing of the world's most influential people, which featured a brief essay written by Albert Nobbs co-star Glenn Close. In June, Wasikowska was invited to join the Academy of Motion Picture Arts and Sciences. In December, she was among a group of actors who filmed a series of shorts from The New York Times titled Touch of Evil, which honored the art of cinematic villainy.

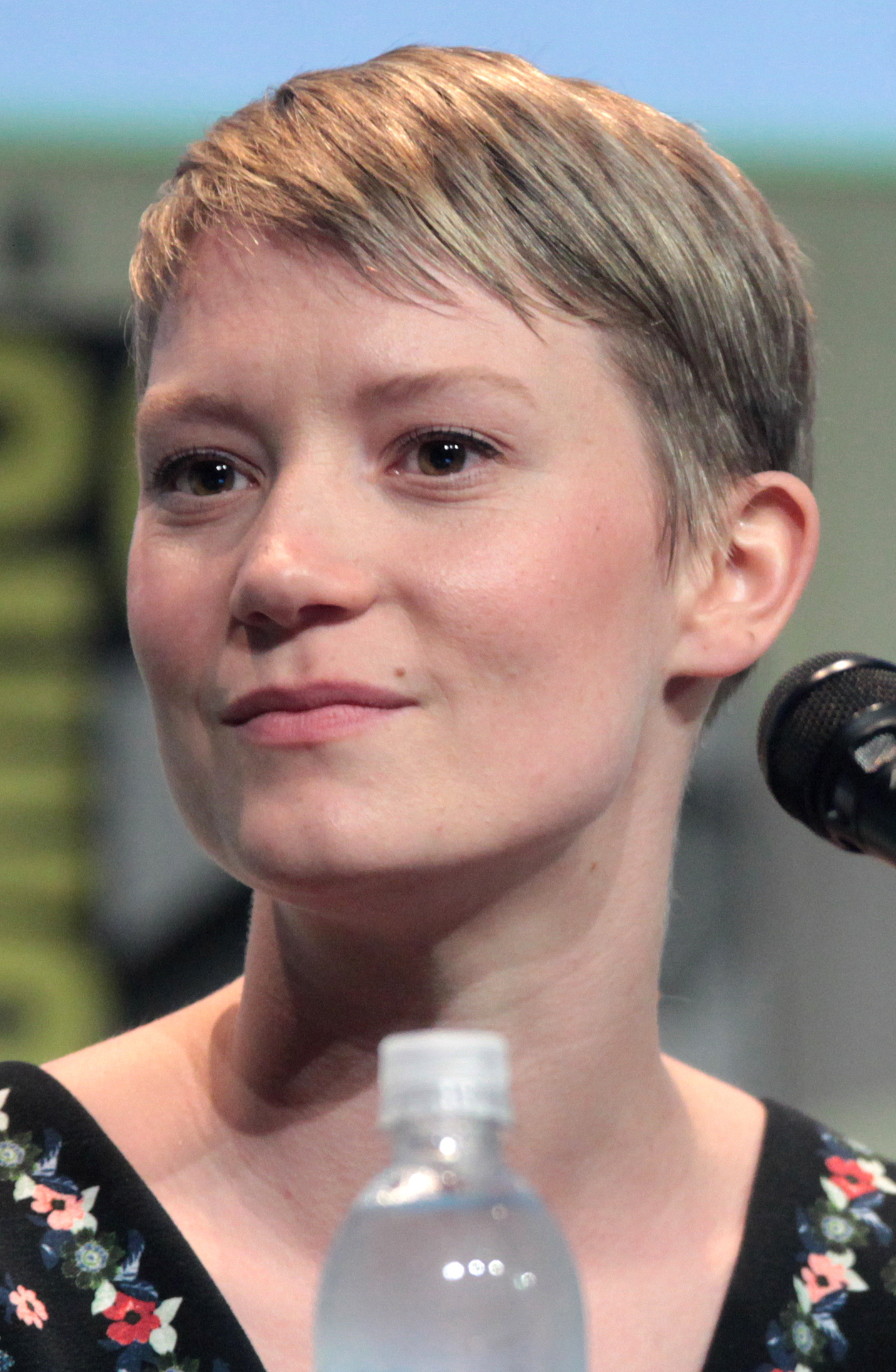
Wasikowska at the 2015 San Diego Comic-Con

In 2011, Wasikowska played the small supporting role of Shia LaBeouf's character's love interest in John Hillcoat's Lawless. Later in the year, she filmed the lead in Park Chan-wook's English-language debut, Stoker. Lawless premiered at Cannes in May 2012, while Stoker debuted at Sundance in January 2013. Wasikowska also appeared in Miu Miu's spring 2012 fashion campaign. In 2012, she made her second appearance in a Vanity Fair Hollywood Issue, this time being featured on the cover panel.

Filming of her next project, Richard Ayoade's The Double, began in the UK in May 2012. In July, she shot Jim Jarmusch's vampire drama Only Lovers Left Alive, in which she plays the younger sister of Tilda Swinton's character. Filming of Tracks, director John Curran's adaptation of the Robyn Davidson memoir of the same name, began in October 2012 in Australia, with Wasikowska in the lead role. The film was screened in competition at the 2013 Venice Film Festival.

Wasikowska made her directorial debut on a segment of The Turning, a collection of short stories by Australian author Tim Winton. It premiered in August 2013 at the Melbourne International Film Festival. In July 2013, she began filming David Cronenberg's Maps to the Stars in Toronto. The film was released in 2014. She next played the title role in Sophie Barthes' film adaptation of Madame Bovary, which began shooting on 30 September 2014 in Normandy, France.

Wasikowska replaced Emma Stone in Guillermo del Toro's gothic romance Crimson Peak (2015), where she starred alongside Tom Hiddleston and Jessica Chastain. Production commenced in February 2014. The film premiered at Fantastic Fest on 25 September 2015, and was later released in the United States in October. The film received generally positive reviews from critics, with many praising the production values, performances and direction.

In 2016, Wasikowska reprised the role of Alice in Alice Through the Looking Glass. The film received generally negative reviews and fared badly at the box office, and represented Wasikowska's last major studio release as she moved on thereafter to appear in more independent films.

=== 2017–present: Independent films ===
In May 2015, Wasikowska joined the cast of Cédric Jimenez's historical thriller The Man with the Iron Heart, based on the novel HHhH. She starred alongside Jason Clarke, Rosamund Pike, Jack O'Connell and Jack Reynor. Principal photography began 14 September 2015 in Prague and Budapest, and ended on 1 February 2016. The film was released in 2017. The same year, she starred in Spike Jonze's stage show Changers: A Dance Story, alongside Lakeith Stanfield. Featuring dance choreography by Ryan Heffington, the show premiered at an Opening Ceremony fashion week presentation in September 2017 before opening to the public for a four-night run at the La MaMa Experimental Theatre Club.

In 2018, she appeared in David and Nathan Zellner's black comedy western Damsel, reuniting with her Maps to the Stars co-star Robert Pattinson, and in Nicolas Pesce's psychosexual thriller Piercing, based on Ryū Murakami's 1994 novel of the same name. The following year, she starred in Mirrah Foulkes' feature directorial debut Judy and Punch. The film had its world premiere at the Sundance Film Festival on 27 January 2019. From July to August 2019, Wasikowska made her theatre debut as Ralph in the Sydney Theatre Company production of Nigel Williams' stage adaptation of William Golding's Lord of the Flies. She next appeared in Roger Michell's drama Blackbird, alongside Susan Sarandon and Kate Winslet. It had its world premiere at the Toronto International Film Festival on 6 September 2019.

Wasikowska's sole release of 2020 was Netflix's The Devil All the Time, an adaptation of the novel of the same name by Donald Ray Pollock directed by Antonio Campos. She was part of an ensemble cast formed by Tom Holland, Bill Skarsgård, Riley Keough, Sebastian Stan and previous collaborators Clarke and Pattinson, among others names. In 2021, she starred in Mia Hansen-Løve's Bergman Island, alongside Vicky Krieps, Tim Roth and Anders Danielsen Lie. The film had its world premiere at the Cannes Film Festival on 11 July 2021. As of 2021, Wasikowska had moved to focus more on directing and filmmaking with a feature film script written and was seeking financiers. In 2022, she starred in Robert Connolly's family drama Blueback, alongside Eric Bana, which had its world premiere at the 2022 Toronto International Film Festival. In 2023, she portrayed an unusual schoolteacher in Jessica Hausner's dark comedy thriller film Club Zero.

In 2026, Mia was executive producer and starred in Australian coming-of-age romantic supernatural horror Leviticus.

== Personal life ==
In her spare time, Wasikowska is an avid photographer, often chronicling her travels and capturing images of her film sets with a Rolleiflex camera. During production of Jane Eyre, she had a secret pocket sewn into one of her costumes to conceal a digital camera that she used between takes. One of her on-set images, of Fukunaga and Jane Eyre co-star Jamie Bell, was selected as a finalist in the 2011 National Photographic Portrait Prize hosted by Australia's National Portrait Gallery on 24 February 2011. From 2013 to 2015, Wasikowska dated actor Jesse Eisenberg, her co-star in The Double. Wasikowska resides in Sydney, Australia. She speaks some Polish.

== Filmography ==
=== Film ===
Key
†	Denotes productions that have not yet been released

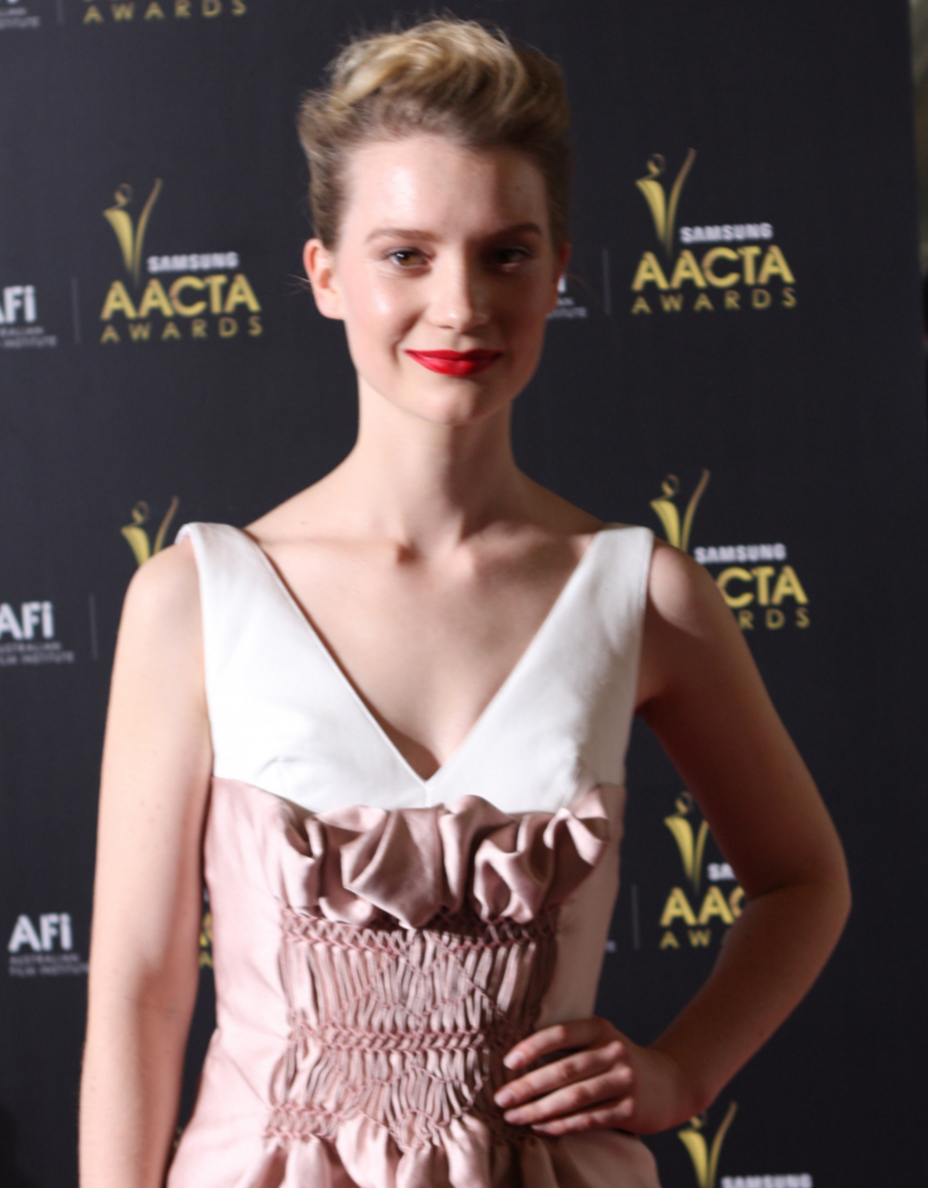
Wasikowska at the 2012 AACTA Awards

Year	Title	Role	Director	Notes
2006	Suburban Mayhem	Lilya	Paul Goldman	
2006	Eve	Eve	Hannah Hilliard	Short film
2007	Lens Love Story	Girl	Sonia Whiteman	Short film
2007	Skin	Emma	Claire McCarthy	Short film
2007	Cosette	Cosette	Samantha Rebillet	Short film
2007	September	Amelia Hamilton	Peter Carstairs	
2007	Rogue	Sherry	Greg McLean	
2008	I Love Sarah Jane	Sarah Jane	Spencer Susser	Short film
2008	Summer Breaks	Kara	Sean Kruck	Short film
2008	Defiance	Chaya Dziencielsky	Edward Zwick	
2009	That Evening Sun	Pamela Choat	Scott Teems	
2009	Amelia	Elinor Smith	Mira Nair	
2010	Alice in Wonderland	Alice Kingsleigh	Tim Burton	
2010	The Kids Are All Right	Joni	Lisa Cholodenko	
2011	Jane Eyre	Jane Eyre	Cary Joji Fukunaga	
2011	Restless	Annabel Cotton	Gus Van Sant	
2011	Albert Nobbs	Helen Dawes	Rodrigo García	
2012	Lawless	Bertha Minnix	John Hillcoat	
2013	The Turning	—N/a	Herself	Director; Segment: "Long, Clear View"
2013	Stoker	India Stoker	Park Chan-wook	
2013	Only Lovers Left Alive	Ava	Jim Jarmusch	
2013	Tracks	Robyn Davidson	John Curran	
2013	The Double	Hannah	Richard Ayoade	
2014	Maps to the Stars	Agatha Weiss	David Cronenberg	
2014	Madame Bovary	Emma Bovary	Sophie Barthes	
2015	The Nightingale and the Rose	The Nightingale (voice)	Del Kathryn Barton & Brendan Fletcher	Short film
2015	Crimson Peak	Edith Cushing	Guillermo del Toro	
2015	Madly	—N/a	Herself	Director and writer Segment: "Afterbirth"
2016	Alice Through the Looking Glass	Alice Kingsleigh	James Bobin	
2017	The Man with the Iron Heart	Anna Novak	Cédric Jimenez	
2018	Damsel	Penelope	David Zellner & Nathan Zellner	
2018	Piercing	Jackie	Nicolas Pesce	
2019	Judy and Punch	Judy	Mirrah Foulkes	
2019	Blackbird	Anna	Roger Michell	
2020	The Devil All the Time	Helen Hatton	Antonio Campos	
2021	Bergman Island	Amy / Herself	Mia Hansen-Løve	
2022	Blueback	Abby Jackson	Robert Connolly	
2023	Club Zero	Miss Novak	Jessica Hausner	
2026	Leviticus	Arlene Reid	Adrian Chiarella	
2026	Fing!	Mrs. Mink	Jeff Walker	
2026	Agata the Writer	Agata	Kuba Dorabialski	
TBA	Twice Over	Anna	Alena Lodkina	Post-production

=== Television ===
Year	Title	Role	Notes
2004–05	All Saints	Lily Watson	Episodes: "Out on a Limb" and "Sins of the Mothers"
2008	In Treatment	Sophie	Regular role (9 episodes)
2026	The Killings at Parrish Station	Georgia Cooke	

=== Video games ===
Year	Title	Role
2010	Alice in Wonderland	Alice Kingsleigh (voice)
2015	Disney Infinity 3.0	Alice Kingsleigh (voice)

== Awards and nominations ==
Year	Association	Category	Nominated work	Result
2008	Australian Film Institute	Young Actor's Award	Suburban Mayhem	Nominated
2009	Australian Film Institute	AFI International Award for Best Actress	In Treatment	Nominated
2009	SXSW Film Festival	Special Jury Award for Best Ensemble Cast	That Evening Sun	Won
2010	Independent Spirit Awards	Best Supporting Female	That Evening Sun	Nominated
2010	Australian Film Institute	AFI International Award for Best Actress	Alice in Wonderland	Won
2010	Teen Choice Awards	Choice Movie: Fight	Alice in Wonderland	Won
2010	Teen Choice Awards	Choice Movie Actress: Fantasy	Alice in Wonderland	Nominated
2010	Teen Choice Awards	Choice Movie: Breakout Female	Alice in Wonderland	Nominated
2010	Hollywood Film Festival	Hollywood Breakthrough Award for Actress of the Year	The Kids Are All Right	Won
2010	Boston Society of Film Critics	Best Ensemble Cast	The Kids Are All Right	Nominated
2010	Gotham Awards	Best Ensemble Cast	The Kids Are All Right	Nominated
2010	Washington DC Area Film Critics Association	Best Acting Ensemble	The Kids Are All Right	Nominated
2010	Detroit Film Critics Society	Best Breakthrough Performance	The Kids Are All Right	Nominated
2011	Broadcast Film Critics Association	Critics Choice Award for Best Acting Ensemble	The Kids Are All Right	Nominated
2011	Screen Actors Guild	Outstanding Performance by a Cast in a Motion Picture	The Kids Are All Right	Nominated
2011	Empire Awards	Best Newcomer	Alice in Wonderland	Nominated
2011	British Independent Film Awards	Best Actress	Jane Eyre	Nominated
2011	Alliance of Women Film Journalists	EDA Award for Most Outrageous Age Difference Between Two Lovers	Albert Nobbs	Won
2012	Australian Film Institute	AACTA International Award for Best Actress	Jane Eyre	Nominated
2013	British Independent Film Awards	Best Supporting Actress	The Double	Nominated
2013	AACTA Awards	Best Direction	The Turning	Nominated
2014	Fangoria Chainsaw Awards	Best Actress	Stoker	Nominated
2014	Empire Awards	Best Supporting Actress	Stoker	Nominated
2014	Saturn Awards	Best Actress	Stoker	Nominated
2014	Gotham Awards	Best Actress	Tracks	Nominated
2014	San Diego Film Critics Society	Best Actress	Tracks	Nominated
2015	AACTA Awards	Best Actress	Tracks	Nominated
2015	Canadian Screen Awards	Best Supporting Actress	Maps to the Stars	Nominated
2016	Fangoria Chainsaw Awards	Best Actress	Crimson Peak	Nominated
2016	Saturn Awards	Best Actress	Crimson Peak	Nominated
2019	AACTA Awards	Best Actress	Judy and Punch	Nominated

== See also ==
- List of Australian film actors
