= Laura Dern =

American actress (born 1967)

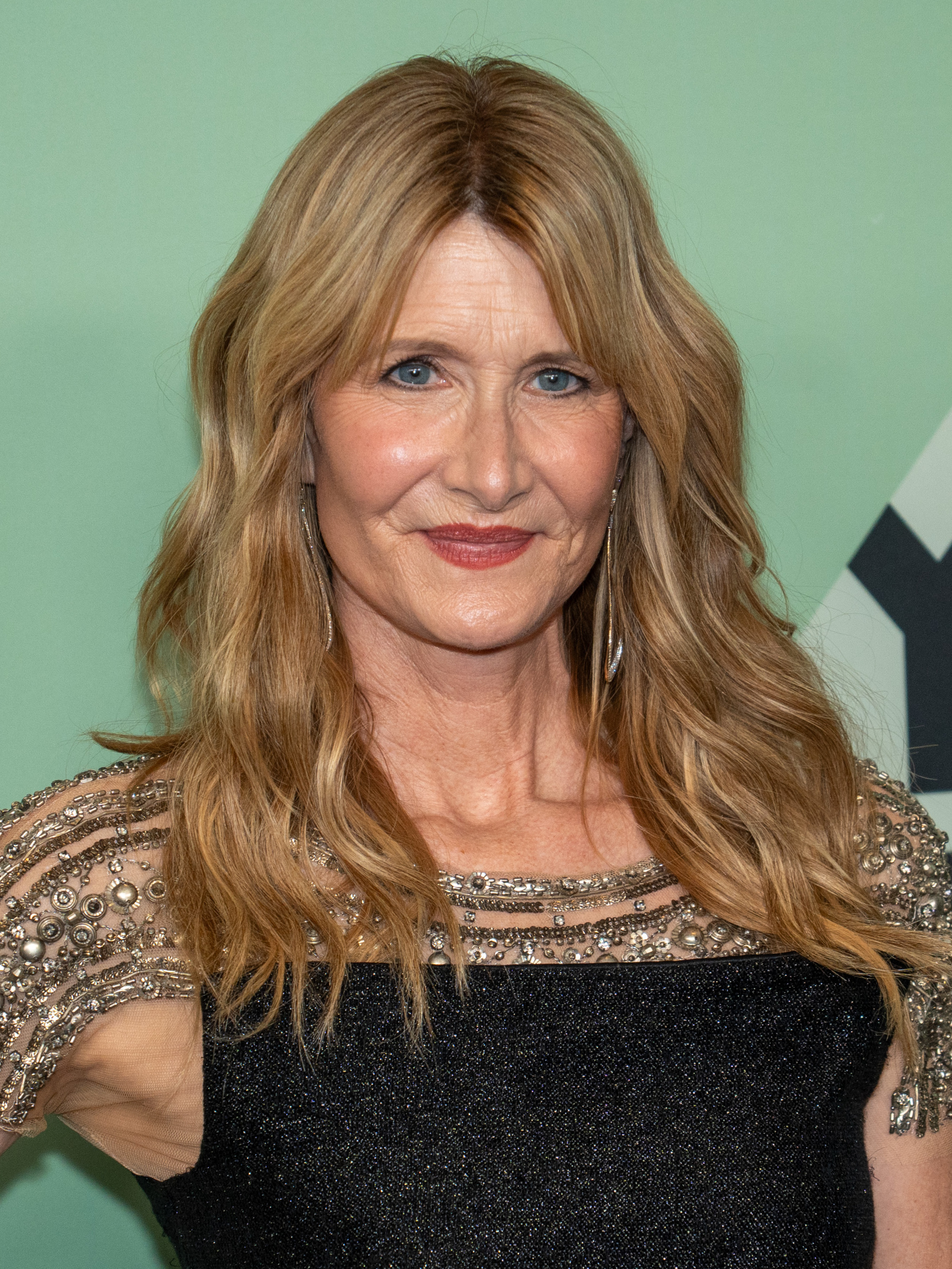
- Dern at the 2025 New York Film Festival
- Born: Laura Elizabeth Dern; February 10, 1967 (age 59); Los Angeles, California, U.S.
- Occupations: Actress; producer
- Years active: 1973–present
- Spouse: Ben Harper (m. 2005; div. 2013)
- Children: 2
- Parents: Bruce Dern (father); Diane Ladd (mother)
- Relatives: George Dern (great-grandfather); Andrew MacLeish (great-great-grandfather); Archibald MacLeish (great-granduncle)
- Awards: Full list

Laura Elizabeth Dern (born February 10, 1967) is an American actress. She is the recipient of numerous accolades, including an Academy Award, an Actor Award, a BAFTA Award, a Primetime Emmy Award, and five Golden Globe Awards. Born to actors Bruce Dern and Diane Ladd, Dern embarked on an acting career in the 1980s and rose to prominence for her performances in Peter Bogdanovich's Mask (1985), Joyce Chopra's Smooth Talk (1985), and in David Lynch's films Blue Velvet (1986) and Wild at Heart (1990).

She received nominations for the Golden Globe Award and the Academy Award for Best Actress for her role as the orphan Rose in the drama film Rambling Rose (1991), and received her first Golden Globe Award for her performance in the television film Afterburn (1992). She achieved international recognition for her role as Ellie Sattler in Steven Spielberg's adventure film Jurassic Park (1993), a role she reprised in the sequels Jurassic Park III (2001) and Jurassic World Dominion (2022).

Other lead film roles include Citizen Ruth (1995), Lynch's Inland Empire (2006), Certain Women (2016), and The Tale (2018).

After winning two Golden Globes for her performances as Katherine Harris in the television film Recount (2008), and Amy Jellicoe in the comedy series Enlightened (2011–2013), Dern garnered her second Academy Award nomination for her performance as the mother of Cheryl Strayed in the biopic Wild (2014).

In 2017, she first portrayed Renata Klein in the drama series Big Little Lies (2017–2019), winning a Primetime Emmy Award and a Golden Globe Award for Best Supporting Actress - Television, and reunited with Lynch for the final time in Twin Peaks: The Return (2017).

She also had supporting roles in the films A Perfect World (1993), October Sky (1999), The Fault in Our Stars (2014), Star Wars: The Last Jedi (2017), Little Women (2019), and Marriage Story (2019). Her performance as a strong headed divorce lawyer in the latter won her the Academy Award for Best Supporting Actress, along with the corresponding BAFTA Award and Golden Globe Award.

== Early life ==
Laura Elizabeth Dern was born February 10, 1967 in Los Angeles, California. She is the daughter of actors Diane Ladd and Bruce Dern, and great-granddaughter of former Utah governor and Secretary of War George Dern. Laura was conceived while her parents were filming The Wild Angels. Poet, writer, and Librarian of Congress Archibald MacLeish was her great-great-uncle. After her parents divorced when she was two years old, Dern was largely brought up by her mother and maternal grandmother, Mary, who had Norwegian ancestry, from Oslo. She was raised Catholic. Her godmother was actress Shelley Winters. She developed scoliosis as a child.

Her first film foray was an appearance as an extra in White Lightning (1973), a film in which her mother starred. Her official film debut was an appearance opposite her mother in Alice Doesn't Live Here Anymore (1974). In 1982, Dern, aged just 15, served as Miss Golden Globe. In the same year, she portrayed a rebellious rock band member in the cult film Ladies and Gentlemen, The Fabulous Stains. At 16, after doubling on her classes to graduate high school a semester early, she sought and attained emancipation, which allowed her to work the same number of hours as an adult on films. After moving out of her home at the age of 17, Dern became roommates with Marianne Williamson, who is 15 years older. Dern later enrolled at UCLA intending to double major in psychology and journalism, but withdrew two days into the quarter to film Blue Velvet.

== Career ==
=== 1980–1999: Career beginnings and breakthrough ===
Dern got her first credited role, and starred alongside Jodie Foster in the 1980 coming-of-age film Foxes. At the age of 11, she had originally auditioned for a different role after telling casting directors that she was 14. In 1985, she was cast in the film Smooth Talk two weeks before production began as protagonist Connie Wyatt, a carefree 15-year-old girl who grabs the attention of a predatory stranger. The film won the Grand Jury Prize at the Sundance Film Festival in the Dramatic category in 1986 and received largely favorable reviews. It is seen as the film that launched Dern's career.

Between 1985 and 1990, Dern gained critical acclaim for her performances in Mask, Blue Velvet, and Wild at Heart. The latter two were directed by David Lynch, which began a longstanding collaboration between Dern and Lynch. In the biographical drama film Mask, she played Diana Adams, a blind girl who becomes Rocky Dennis's love interest, starring alongside Eric Stoltz and Cher. At the age of 17, she played Sandy Williams, one of the starring roles alongside Kyle MacLachlan and Isabella Rossellini, in the critically successful mystery thriller film Blue Velvet. It is widely regarded as Dern's breakthrough performance.

In 1990, Dern once again collaborated with Lynch, and starred opposite Nicolas Cage in the black comedy crime film Wild At Heart, in which Dern played a vastly different character from her previous role in Blue Velvet. Dern called the role an opportunity 'to play not only a very sexual person, but also someone who was, in her own way, incredibly comfortable with herself'. The film, which had won the Palme d'Or at the Cannes Film Festival, was met with generally positive reviews from critics, but polarized some audiences at the time. Ladd appeared in a supporting role for the film.

Dern was cast for The Silence of the Lambs (1991), but lost the role due to studio's skepticism about her level of fame at the time. In 1992, Dern and Ladd became the first mother and daughter to be nominated for Academy Awards for acting in the same film for their performances in Rambling Rose. Ladd received a Best Supporting Actress nomination, and Dern received one for Best Actress. The following year, she won a Golden Globe Award for Best Actress – Miniseries or Television Film and received her first Primetime Emmy Award nomination for her performance as Air Force widow Janet Harduvel in the 1992 television film Afterburn.

Dern played paleobotanist Ellie Sattler in Steven Spielberg's 1993 film Jurassic Park, achieving international recognition with the role. Dern, who had been more focused on independent films prior to the film, was Spielberg's first choice for the role of Ellie, after having been impressed with her work in Smooth Talk and Rambling Rose. She was influenced by Cage to take the role, and called the decision an "easy yes", recalling how Spielberg and producer Kathleen Kennedy made sure the character was a "no-nonsense feminist who had her own independent spirit and was brilliant in her craft", and wasn't an "oversexualized action heroine" while describing filming to be similar to an independent film.

That same year, Dern starred in Clint Eastwood's film A Perfect World. After the release of Jurassic Park, Dern was offered many roles in blockbuster films, but to avoid typecasting, ultimately chose to star in Alexander Payne's directorial debut black comedy film Citizen Ruth. In the film, she played a pregnant drug addict who unexpectedly attracts national attention from those involved in the abortion debate. It debuted at Sundance Film Festival to critical acclaim for the film and for Dern's performance, but only received a limited release from Miramax, likely due to its controversial topic. Ladd made a cameo appearance, playing her mother for the third time, following Rambling Rose and Wild At Heart, with Dern's character screaming a torrent of abuse at her.

In 1997, Dern was asked by Ellen DeGeneres to guest star as Susan Richmond in "The Puppy Episode" of the sitcom Ellen. Richmond is a lesbian who helps Degeneres' character, Ellen Morgan, come out of the closet, while DeGeneres herself came out at the same time offscreen. According to Dern, people close to her worried about her taking the role, and two of her advisors told her not to accept it. Dern, however, immediately accepted the role, calling it an "extraordinary experience and opportunity" and "an incredible honor." There was a public backlash toward the groundbreaking episode, which was the first appearance of an openly gay character in a leading role on television. After the episode aired, Dern needed a full security detail. She stopped regularly receiving roles, and she did not work for a year. She earned her third Primetime Emmy Award nomination for her performance in the episode. (Note: Attributed to multiple references:) The following year, Dern co-starred in the television film The Baby Dance, for which she received a Golden Globe nomination. In Joe Johnston's 1999 biographical film October Sky, she played a teacher who supports her students as they build rockets.

=== 2000–2011: Further film and television career ===
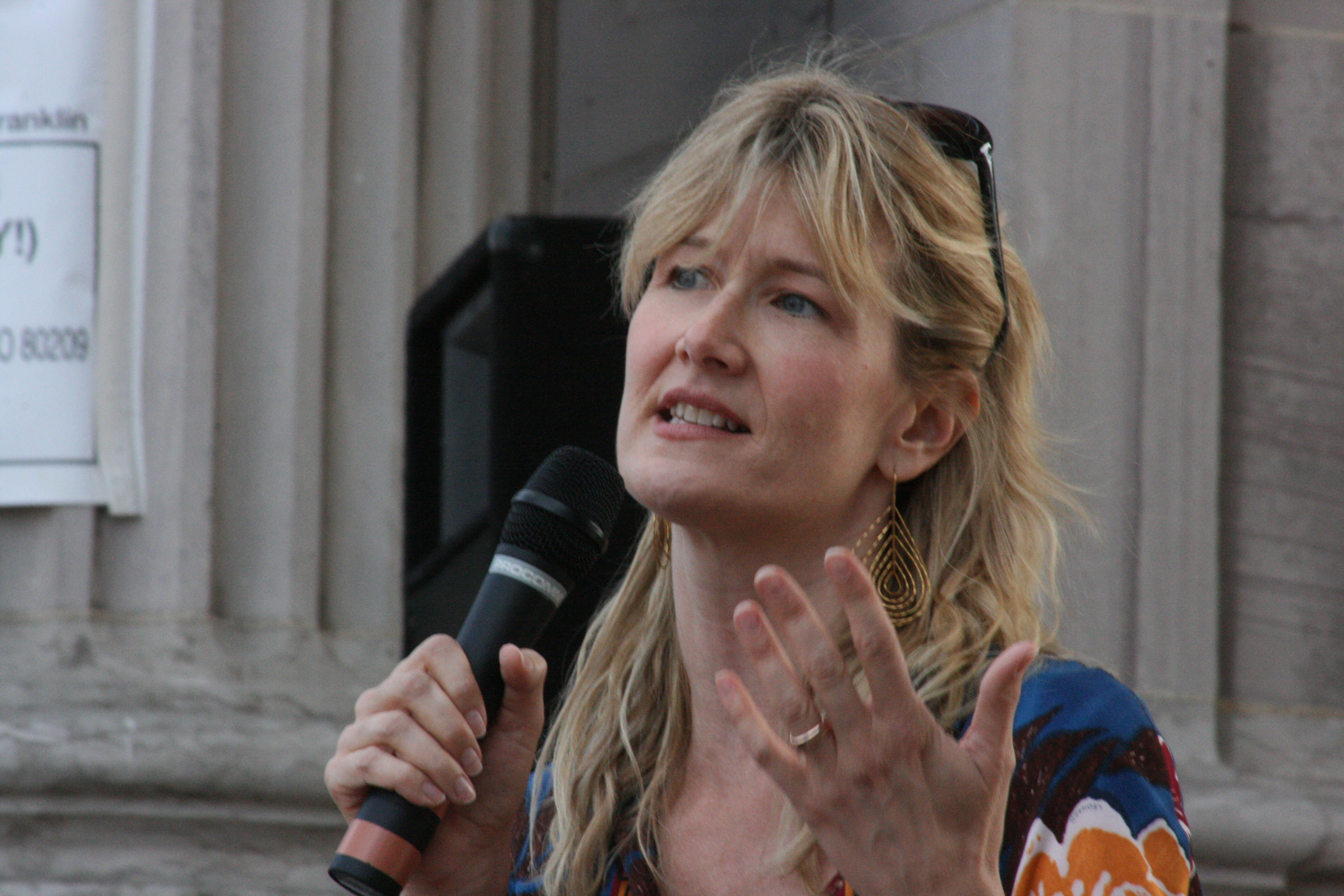
Dern at Civic Center Park in 2008

In 2000, Robert Altman cast Dern in his comedy Dr. T & the Women. In 2001, Dern reprised her role as Ellie in Jurassic Park III, which was directed by Johnston, whom she had worked with in October Sky. Originally hesitant to return for a cameo, Dern was convinced when it was suggested by executive producer Steven Spielberg to the writers, Alexander Payne and Jim Taylor who had previously collaborated with Dern for Citizen Ruth, to have the character play an important role by saving the other characters. That same year, she co-starred in Within These Walls and Arthur Miller's Focus. In Billy Bob Thornton's film Daddy and Them, Dern played the wife of the husband. She starred in the film I Am Sam as Randy Carpenter, a woman running a foster home. In 2002, she starred in the film Damaged Care. In 2004, she starred in the film We Don't Live Here Anymore. Dern starred in the 2005 film Happy Endings, and in the same year, she appeared in the film The Prize Winner of Defiance, Ohio.

In 2006, Dern reunited with director David Lynch for the third time after Blue Velvet and Wild At Heart in the experimental film Inland Empire which was largely shot on a hand-held Sony DSR-PD150 by Lynch himself and without a complete screenplay. Dern played an actress, Nikki Grace, who starts to take on the personality of the character she plays. The film debuted at the Venice Film Festival to polarized reviews, the majority being positive, where Dern admitted that she was not sure what the film was about, but has said she would sign up for any project with Lynch. Retrospectively, Dern's performance was named the 19th greatest movie performance of the 21st century by The Ringer. That same year, Dern had a supporting role in Lonely Hearts. She starred in Mike White's directorial debut film Year of the Dog, alongside Molly Shannon, John C. Reilly, and Peter Sarsgaard. In 2008, Dern starred as Florida Secretary of State Katherine Harris in Recount, for which she won the Golden Globe Award for Best Supporting Actress – Series, Miniseries or Television Film. The following year, Dern appeared in the independent drama Tenderness, and in 2010, she appeared in Little Fockers, portraying Prudence, an elementary school principal.

In November 2010, Dern and her parents Diane Ladd and Bruce Dern were presented with stars on the Hollywood Walk of Fame, becoming the first family to do so. In October 2011, she starred in a new HBO comedy-drama television series titled Enlightened in which she also served as co-creator and executive producer. Dern played Amy Jellicoe, a "health and beauty executive who returns from a post-meltdown retreat to pick up the pieces of her broken life." Dern brought screenwriter Mike White, whom she collaborated with on Year of the Dog, back into television work after he had suffered an on-the-job meltdown of his own. The series received critical acclaim and lasted two seasons. Dern's mother Diane Ladd plays the major supporting role of Helen Jellicoe, Dern's character's mother in the series. Dern received her third Golden Globe Award and fifth nomination, her first in the Best Actress in a Television Series – Musical or Comedy category for her performance. She was also nominated for her fifth Primetime Emmy Award, her first in the Outstanding Lead Actress in a Comedy Series category.

=== 2012–present: Later career and acclaim ===
In 2012, Dern starred in Paul Thomas Anderson's psychological drama film The Master. In 2014, she co-starred alongside Reese Witherspoon in Jean-Marc Vallée's biographical drama film Wild portraying the character of Bobbi, mother of Cheryl Strayed in flashback scenes, for which she received her second Academy Award nomination (Best Supporting Actress). That same year, she portrayed Frannie Lancaster in the coming-of-age romance film The Fault In Our Stars and she portrays Beverly Ladouceur in the sports drama film When the Game Stands Tall directed by Thomas Carter, starring Jim Caviezel and produced by David Zelon for Mandalay Pictures. She portrayed Lynn Nash, a widowed mother and grandmother who gets evicted with her family, in 2014's 99 Homes alongside Andrew Garfield.

In 2017, Dern reteamed with both Witherspoon and Vallée from Wild and The Fault In Our Stars co-star Shailene Woodley for the 2017 HBO miniseries Big Little Lies, the latter who Dern had helped convince to join the cast. For her portrayal as the fierce and high-powered tech CEO Renata Klein in the series, Dern won her first Primetime Emmy Award and her fourth Golden Globe Award. That same year, she collaborated for the fourth time with David Lynch, appearing as Diane Evans in the third season of the mystery serial drama television series Twin Peaks and joined the Star Wars franchise, portraying Vice-Admiral Amilyn Holdo in Rian Johnson's space opera film Star Wars: The Last Jedi.

In 2018, Dern starred as professor and documentary filmmaker Jennifer Fox, recalling her traumatic past in the autobiographical feature film The Tale, written and directed by Fox. The film premiered at the 2018 Sundance Film Festival on January 20, 2018, to a standing ovation, and later on HBO on May 26, 2018. Dern received her seventh Primetime Emmy nomination for the role in the category Outstanding Lead Actress In A Limited Series Or Movie. That same year, she starred in two biographical drama films, Trial By Fire and JT LeRoy as the author Laura Albert.

In 2019, Dern reprised her role of Renata Klein in Big Little Lies after the series was renewed for a second season where she once again received critical acclaim and received her eighth Primetime Emmy Award nomination. In the same year, Dern starred in two films nominated for Best Picture at the Academy Awards. The first is Noah Baumbach's Marriage Story, portraying divorce lawyer Nora Fanshaw, which was written by Baumbach with Dern in mind for the role. For her performance, Dern received major awards, including winning her first Academy Award from three nominations, winning the first and only Oscar in an acting category for Netflix, and also won the BAFTA, SAG, and the Golden Globe. The second is Greta Gerwig's film adaptation of Little Women, where she portrayed Marmee March. In 2020, she served as an executive producer on the animated short film If Anything Happens I Love You, which was released on Netflix, and was a producer on the documentary film The Way I See It.

In 2022, Dern reprised her role as Dr. Ellie Sattler in Jurassic World Dominion. Due to the character's fan influence, Dern and director Colin Trevorrow felt protective of the character and her legacy, and were in agreement to have the character play a major role. With Neill and Goldblum having led in their own Jurassic Park sequel, Trevorrow wanted Dominion to be Dern's film explaining, "It was important for the plot to be driven by Ellie. She's the only one of those three characters that hasn't had her own movie." She starred in Florian Zeller's 2022 adaptation of his stage play The Son. Dern appeared in the music video for Taylor Swift's "Bejeweled" from her tenth studio album Midnights (2022). Dern reunited with Wild author Cheryl Strayed and served along with Reese Witherspoon as executive producers for the 2023 Hulu television series Tiny Beautiful Things based on Strayed's book. Dern served as an executive producer and starred in the Apple TV+ period television series Palm Royale.

She starred in the Netflix film Lonely Planet. Dern is set to star and serve as an executive producer for Justin Kurzel's science fiction film Morning. She and Amy Adams signed on to executive produce a HBO adaptation of Claire Lombardo's The Most Fun We Ever Had.

== Personal life ==
=== Relationships and children ===
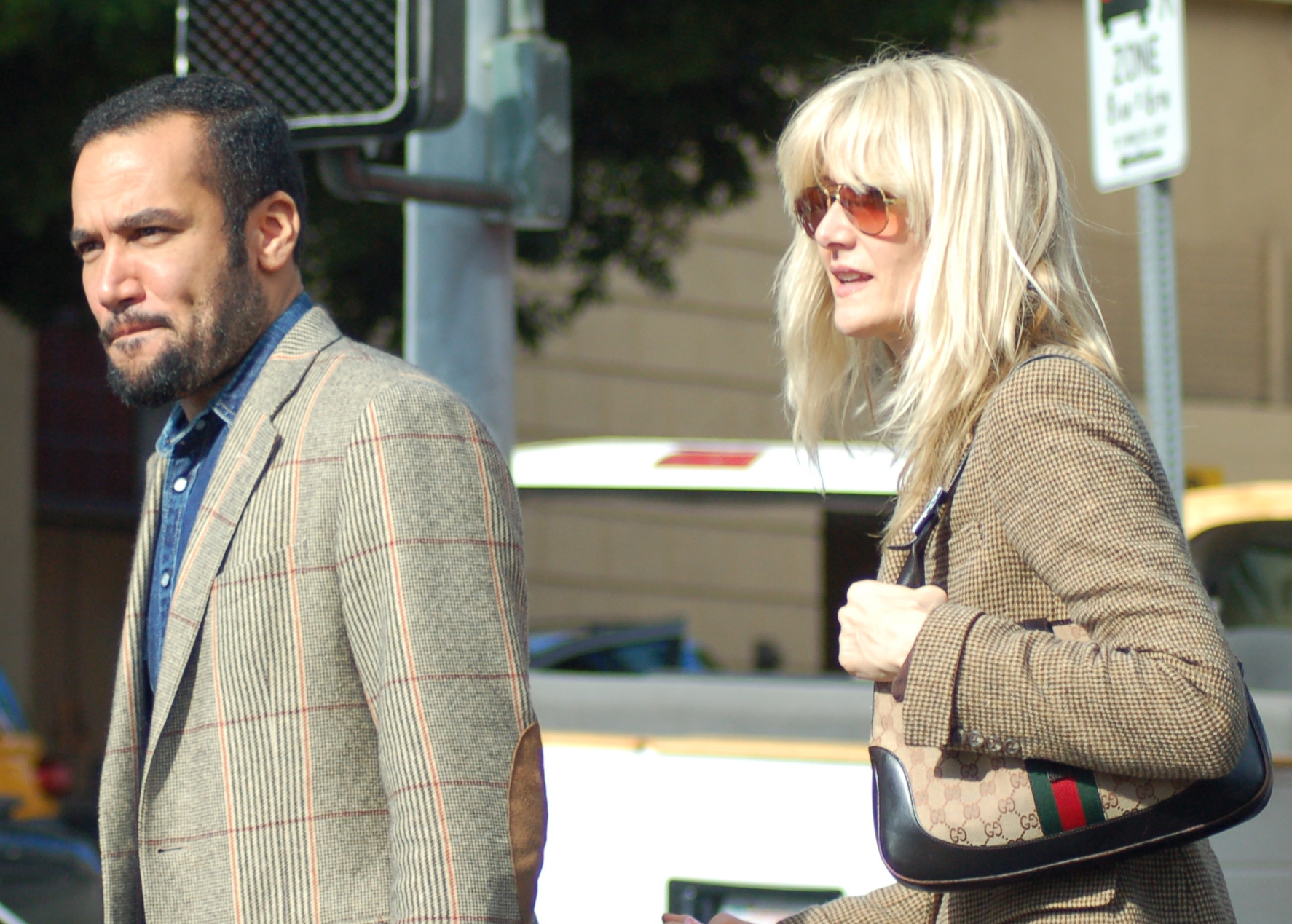
Dern with then-husband Ben Harper in December 2009

Dern was in a relationship with her Blue Velvet co-star Kyle MacLachlan from 1985 to 1989. She began dating Jeff Goldblum while filming Jurassic Park, and the relationship ended in 1997. Dern also dated Billy Bob Thornton from 1997 to 1999. They were engaged until she discovered he was dating Angelina Jolie. In autumn 2000, Dern began dating musician Ben Harper after they met at one of his concerts. Harper and Dern married on December 23, 2005, at their home in Los Angeles. They have two children together, son Ellery Walker (born August 21, 2001) and daughter Jaya (born November 2004). Through this marriage, Dern became stepmother to Harper's children from his first marriage. The two finalized their divorce in 2013.

On October 18, 2017, in the wake of the Harvey Weinstein sexual abuse scandal, Dern appeared on The Ellen DeGeneres Show and revealed that she had been sexually assaulted at age 14.

=== Political views and activism ===
During the 2009 Golden Globes, Dern expressed support for the incoming administration of Barack Obama during her acceptance speech for her Best Supporting Actress – Series, Miniseries or Television Film win, stating: "I will cherish this as a reminder of the extraordinary, incredible outpouring of people who demanded their voice be heard in this last election so we can look forward to amazing change in this country. Thank you so much!"

An activist and supporter of various charities, Dern advocated Down syndrome awareness in a cover story for Ability Magazine. In 2018, Dern brought activist Mónica Ramírez to the 75th Golden Globe Awards as a guest. In September 2018, Dern asked people to vote for Dean Phillips in his congressional race, while on her way to the 70th Primetime Emmy Awards ceremony. In the same year, she attended a Families Belong Together event and expressed her support for immigrants' rights. She is also an advocate for women's rights, gender pay parity, as well as combating gun violence and climate change. In 2019, she became a board member of the Academy Museum of Motion Pictures. Dern is an ambassador for the American Lung Association and serves as an Advisor to the group's National Board of Directors.

== Filmography ==
=== Film ===
Year	Title	Role	Notes
1973	White Lightning	Sharon Anne	Uncredited
1974	Alice Doesn't Live Here Anymore	Girl Eating Ice Cream Cone	Uncredited
1980	Foxes	Debbie	
1982	Ladies and Gentlemen, The Fabulous Stains	Jessica McNeil	
1983	Grizzly II: Revenge	Tina	Released in 2020
1984	Teachers	Diane Warren	
1985	Mask	Diana Adams	
1985	Smooth Talk	Connie Wyatt	
1986	Blue Velvet	Sandy Williams	
1988	Haunted Summer	Claire Clairmont	
1989	Fat Man and Little Boy	Kathleen Robinson	
1990	Wild at Heart	Lula Fortune	
1990	Industrial Symphony No. 1	Heartbroken Woman	Concert film
1991	Rambling Rose	Rose	
1993	Jurassic Park	Ellie Sattler	
1993	A Perfect World	Sally Gerber	
1996	Citizen Ruth	Ruth Stoops	
1996	Bastard Out of Carolina	Narrator (voice)	
1999	October Sky	Miss Riley	
2000	Dr. T & the Women	Peggy	
2001	Daddy and Them	Ruby Montgomery	
2001	Jurassic Park III	Ellie Sattler	
2001	Focus	Gertrude "Gert" Hart	
2001	I Am Sam	Randy Carpenter	
2001	Novocaine	Jean Noble	
2002	Goose	Narrator (voice)	Short film
2002	Searching for Debra Winger	Herself	Documentary
2004	We Don't Live Here Anymore	Terry Linden	
2005	Happy Endings	Pam Ferris	
2005	The Prize Winner of Defiance, Ohio	Dortha Schaefer	
2006	Lonely Hearts	Rene Fodie	
2006	Inland Empire	Nikki Grace / Susan Blue	Also co-producer
2007	Year of the Dog	Bret Spade	
2008	The Monday Before Thanksgiving	Theresa	Short film
2009	Tenderness	Aunt Teresa	
2010	Everything Must Go	Delilah	
2010	Little Fockers	Prudence Simmons	
2011	Fight for Your Right Revisited	Café Patron	Short film
2012	The Master	Helen Sullivan	
2013	Jay-Z: Made in America	Herself	Documentary
2014	The Fault in Our Stars	Frannie Lancaster	
2014	When the Game Stands Tall	Beverly Ladouceur	
2014	Wild	Bobbi Lambrecht	
2014	99 Homes	Lynn Nash	
2015	Bravetown	Annie	
2016	Certain Women	Laura Wells	
2016	The Founder	Ethel Kroc	
2017	Wilson	Pippi	
2017	The Black Ghiandola	Doctor	Short film
2017	The Good Time Girls	Clementine	Short film
2017	Downsizing	Laura Lonowski	
2017	Star Wars: The Last Jedi	Vice Admiral Amilyn Holdo	
2018	The Tale	Jennifer Fox	
2018	Trial by Fire	Elizabeth Gilbert	
2018	JT LeRoy	Laura Albert	
2019	Cold Pursuit	Grace Coxman	
2019	Marriage Story	Nora Fanshaw	
2019	Little Women	Marmee March	
2020	Crazy, Not Insane	Narrator (voice)	Documentary
2020	If Anything Happens I Love You	—N/a	Executive producer, animated short film
2020	The Way I See It	—N/a	Producer, documentary
2022	Jurassic World Dominion	Ellie Sattler	
2022	The Son	Kate	
2023	Ozi: Voice of the Forest	Ozi's Mother (voice)	
2024	Lonely Planet	Katherine Loewe	
2025	Caught Stealing	Hank Thompson's mother	Uncredited cameo
2025	Jay Kelly	Liz	
2025	Is This Thing On?	Tess Novak	
TBA	Peaked †	TBA	Post-production
TBA	Monsanto †	Dr. Melinda Rogers	Filming

=== Television ===
Year	Title	Role	Notes
1980	Insight	Amy	Episode: "Who Loves Amy Tonight?"
1981	Shannon	Unknown	Episode: "Gotham Swansong"
1983	Happy Endings	Audrey Constantine	Television film
1984	The Three Wishes of Billy Grier	Crissy	Television film
1989	Nightmare Classics	Rebecca	Episode: "The Strange Case of Dr. Jekyll and Mr. Hyde"
1992	Afterburn	Janet Harduvel	Television film
1993	Fallen Angels	Annie Ainsley	Episode: "Murder, Obliquely"
1994	The Gift	—N/a	Television film; director
1995	Frasier	June (voice)	Episode: "Sleeping with the Enemy"
1995	Down Came a Blackbird	Helen McNulty	Television film; also executive producer
1996	The Siege at Ruby Ridge	Vicki Weaver	Television film
1997	Ellen	Susan Richmond	Episodes: "The Puppy Episode"
1998	The Larry Sanders Show	Herself	Episode: "I Buried Sid"
1998	The Baby Dance	Wanda LeFauve	Television film
2001	Within These Walls	Sister Pauline Quinn	Television film
2002	Damaged Care	Linda Peeno	Television film; also co-producer
2002	The West Wing	US Poet Laureate Tabatha Fortis	Episode: "The U.S. Poet Laureate"
2002–2003	King of the Hill	Serving Wench / Katherine (voices)	2 episodes
2008	Recount	Katherine Harris	Television film
2011–2013	Enlightened	Amy Jellicoe	18 episodes; also co-creator and executive producer
2013	Call Me Crazy: A Five Film	—N/a	Television film; director (segment: "Grace")
2014	Kroll Show	Cleo	2 episodes
2014	Drunk History	Nellie Bly	Episode: "New York City"
2015	The Mindy Project	Dr. Ludmilla Trapeznikov	Episode: "Best Man"
2015–2021	F Is for Family	Sue Murphy (voice)	44 episodes
2017–2019	Big Little Lies	Renata Klein	14 episodes
2017	The Last Man on Earth	Catherine	Episode: "Got Milk?"
2017	Unbreakable Kimmy Schmidt	Wendy Hebert	Episode: "Kimmy Can't Help You!"
2017	Twin Peaks: The Return	Diane Evans	9 episodes
2022	The White Lotus	Abby (voice)	2 episodes; uncredited
2024–2026	Palm Royale	Linda Shaw	14 episodes; also executive producer

=== Video games ===
Year	Title	Role	Notes
2015	Lego Jurassic World	Ellie Sattler	Archive audio from the films
2019	Jurassic World Evolution	Ellie Sattler	Return to Jurassic Park expansion
2022	Jurassic World Evolution 2	Ellie Sattler	Biosyn Dominion expansion

=== Music videos ===
Year	Title	Artist(s)	Role
2022	"Bejeweled"	Taylor Swift	Stepmother

== Bibliography ==
- Dern, Laura; Ladd, Diane (2023). Honey, Baby, Mine: A Mother and Daughter Talk Life, Death, Love (and Banana Pudding). Grand Central Publishing. ISBN 978-1-538-72037-0.

== Awards and nominations ==
Dern has received numerous accolades for her work in film and television. These include an Academy Award, an Actor Award, a BAFTA Award, an Emmy Award, and five Golden Globe Awards.

Dern received critical acclaim and was nominated for the Academy Award and Golden Globe for Best Actress for portraying the titular orphan in the drama Rambling Rose (1991). Dern's nomination for the Oscar, alongside her mother Diane Ladd, marked the second, and (as of 2024) most recent, time that a parent and child received acting nominations together for roles in the same film. (Note: After Henry Fonda and Jane Fonda for On Golden Pond (1981).) The following year, her performance in the television drama film Afterburn (1992) won her the Golden Globe and earned her a nomination for the Primetime Emmy Award for Outstanding Actress in a Miniseries or Movie. She received another four Emmy nominations—for Outstanding Guest Actress in a Drama and Comedy Series, Outstanding Supporting Actress in a Miniseries or Movie and Outstanding Lead Actress in a Comedy Series—for her respective performances in Fallen Angels (1994), Ellen (1997), Recount (2008) and Enlightened (2013). The latter two also won her Golden Globe Awards, for Best Supporting Actress and Best Actress in a Television Series – Musical or Comedy, respectively.

Dern's performance of a dedicated mother in the HBO black comedy drama series Big Little Lies (2017–2019) was widely acclaimed. For the first season, she won the Critics' Choice, Golden Globe and Primetime Emmy Award for Outstanding Supporting Actress in a Limited Series or Movie and was nominated for the Screen Actors Guild Award for Outstanding Actress in a Miniseries or Movie (which she lost to costar Nicole Kidman). The second season earned Dern nominations for the Critics' Choice and Primetime Emmy Award for Outstanding Supporting Actress in a Drama Series and the Screen Actors Guild Award for Outstanding Performance by an Ensemble in a Drama Series. The television drama film The Tale (2018) earned Dern nominations for the Critics' Choice, Golden Globe and Primetime Emmy Award for Outstanding Lead Actress in a Limited Series or Movie.

Dern's critically acclaimed roles in the independent drama films Wild (2014) and Marriage Story (2019) earned her nominations for the Academy Award for Best Supporting Actress; winning for her portrayal of a divorce lawyer in the latter, which also won her the BAFTA, Critics' Choice, Golden Globe and SAG Award in that category. The same year, Dern's role as part of the ensemble cast of Greta Gerwig's widely acclaimed adaptation of Little Women earned her a nomination for the Critics' Choice Movie Award for Best Acting Ensemble.

Dern has also achieved various awards records. The daughter of actors Bruce Dern and Diane Ladd, both of whom received Academy Award nominations of their own, Dern is one of few second-generation Academy Award nominees. With her eight Emmy nominations, Dern is among a select few actors to be nominated across all three performance (lead, supporting and guest) and genre (comedy, drama, limited series or movie) categories. With her five Golden Globe Award wins, she is the sixth-most awarded actor. (Note: Behind Meryl Streep (with eight) and Alan Alda, Angela Lansbury, Jack Nicholson and Nicole Kidman (with six); and tied with Ed Asner, Carol Burnett, Jessica Lange, Rosalind Russell and Kate Winslet.) Having won both an Academy Award and Emmy Award for acting, Dern is just a Tony Award away from achieving the Triple Crown of Acting.

== See also ==
- List of American film actresses
- List of actors with Academy Award nominations
- List of actors with more than one Academy Award nomination in the acting categories
- List of Academy Award–winning families
- List of Primetime Emmy Award winners
- List of Golden Globe winners
