= Tracks (2013 film) =

- Theatrical release poster
- Directed by: John Curran
- Screenplay by: Marion Nelson
- Based on: Tracks by Robyn Davidson
- Produced by: Iain Canning; Emile Sherman
- Starring: Mia Wasikowska; Adam Driver
- Cinematography: Mandy Walker
- Edited by: Alexandre de Franceschi
- Music by: Garth Stevenson
- Production company: See-Saw Films
- Distributed by: Transmission Films; Paramount Pictures
- Release dates: 29 August 2013 (Venice); 10 October 2013 (Adelaide); 19 September 2014 (United States)
- Running time: 113 minutes
- Country: Australia
- Language: English
- Budget: $12 million
- Box office: $4.9 million

Tracks is a 2013 Australian drama film directed by John Curran and starring Mia Wasikowska and Adam Driver. It is an adaptation of Robyn Davidson's memoir of the same name, chronicling the author's nine-month journey on camels across the Australian desert. It was shown at the 2013 Toronto International Film Festival (Special Presentation) and the 70th Venice International Film Festival 2013 (in Official Competition). It premiered in Australia as the opening film at the Adelaide Film Festival on 10 October 2013. The film has been shown at several other film festivals, including London, Vancouver, Telluride, Dubai, Sydney OpenAir, Dublin and Glasgow.

== Summary ==
In 1977, Robyn Davidson moves to Alice Springs planning to start a cross country trip of 2,700 kilometres (1,700 miles) crossing the Australian deserts to the Indian Ocean with her dog, Diggity, and four dromedary camels.

For a while, Robyn works for farmers, learning the way to train camels in exchange for board and camels. A group of friends come to visit her and introduce her to National Geographic photographer Rick Smolan. When Robyn mentions that she is short of funds needed for the trip, Rick suggests she write to National Geographic for funding.

National Geographic buys the rights to Robyn's story and provides her with funding for the trip, but also make it part of the deal that Rick takes pictures for the story. Robyn finds Rick and his photographs frustrating.

At one of the stops where Rick photographs her, Robyn lashes out. They later have sex, which Rick interprets as the start of a relationship, while Robyn only means it as a casual fling.

Later, they encounter a group of indigenous people. Rick takes photos of a private ceremony which Robyn disapproves of. Afterwards, Robyn learns her trip runs through sacred land, which women are not allowed to pass through without a guide. Because of Rick's actions, no one wants to help her. Later Robyn encounters a group of indigenous men who, hearing of her dilemma, decide to help her. A Mr. Eddy, a respected elder, travels with Robyn as a guide, and the two form a close bond, with Robyn inviting him on an extra leg of her trip. She gifts him a rifle.

Diggity is poisoned by strychnine and Robyn has to put her down, her trip seems to spiral with reporters and Rick showing up looking for her as they thought her missing. Briefly she decides to give up on the trip but after Rick promises to send the mass of reporters off in a different direction she finishes what she started, arriving to only the one lens of Rick’s camera.

== Cast ==
- Mia Wasikowska as Robyn Davidson
- Adam Driver as Rick Smolan
- Lily Pearl as young Robyn Davidson
- Rolley Mintuma as Mr Eddy
- Brendan Maclean as Peter
- Rainer Bock as Kurt
- Jessica Tovey as Jenny
- Emma Booth as Marg
- Tim Rogers as Glendle
- Edwin Hodgeman as Mr. Ward
- John Flaus as Sallay Mahomet

== Production ==
There were five attempts in the early 1980s and 1990s to adapt the book as a film. In 1993, Julia Roberts was attached to star in a planned Caravan Pictures adaptation. The project eventually fell apart.

In May 2012, it was reported that Mia Wasikowska would play Robyn Davidson in a John Curran-directed adaptation. In August, Adam Driver was cast as Rick Smolan. The screenplay was written by Marion Nelson, based on Davidson's book.

Finance was sourced from Screen Australia, the South Australian Film Corporation, Adelaide Film Festival, Deluxe Australia, and Screen NSW.

With a US$12 million budget, the film began shooting on 8 October 2012. It was filmed in South Australia and the Northern Territory. The film was produced by Emile Sherman and Iain Canning, with Antonia Barnard and Julie Ryan co-producing. Alexandre de Franceschi edited the film, while the music was composed by Garth Stevenson.

== Release ==
Tracks premiered as the opening film at the Adelaide Film Festival on 10 October 2013 and went on to screen at other international festivals. After its theatrical run, the film was released to DVD and Blu-ray on 25 June 2014.

=== Critical response ===
Tracks received mainly positive reviews from critics. Review aggregator website Rotten Tomatoes gives the film a score of 82% based on 129 reviews with an average score of 7/10. The critical consensus states, "What Tracks lacks in excitement, it more than makes up with gorgeous cinematography and Mia Wasikowska's outstanding performance." The film also has a score of 78 out of 100 on Metacritic based on 34 critics, indicating "generally favorable reviews".

Leonard Maltin gave Tracks 3.5 out of 4 stars, and has stated that it is the last movie (by wide release date) that will be included in the final edition of Leonard Maltin's Movie Guide.

Word and Film rated Tracks as the best film adaptation of the year for 2014, and Sydney Arts Guide awarded Marion Nelson the Best Adapted Screenplay Award 2014.

Mandy Walker won 2014 Best Cinematography awards for Tracks from the Australian Cinematographers Society and the Film Critics Circle of Australia.

=== Box office ===
Tracks received a limited theatrical release in North America opening in four theatres and grossing $21,544, with an average of $5,386 per theatre and ranking #62 at the box office. The widest release for the film was 67 theatres, and it ultimately earned $510,007 in North America and $4,368,235 internationally, a total of $5,853,509.

=== Accolades ===
Award	Category	Subject	Result
AACTA Awards (4th)	Best Film	Iain Canning	Nominated
AACTA Awards (4th)	Best Film	Emile Sherman	Nominated
AACTA Awards (4th)	Best Actress	Mia Wasikowska	Nominated
AACTA Awards (4th)	Best Cinematography	Mandy Walker	Nominated
AACTA Awards (4th)	Best Costume Design	Mariot Kerr	Nominated
AFCA Awards (17th)	Best Film	Iain Canning	Nominated
AFCA Awards (17th)	Best Film	Emile Sherman	Nominated
AFCA Awards (17th)	Best Actress	Mia Wasikowska	Nominated
AFCA Awards (17th)	Best Cinematography	Mandy Walker	Nominated
Asia Pacific Screen Awards (7th)	Achievement in Cinematography	Mandy Walker	Nominated
Dublin Film Critics' Circle (2013)	Best Actress	Mia Wasikowska	Nominated
Gotham Awards (2013)	Best Actress	Mia Wasikowska	Nominated
San Diego Film Critics Society Awards (19th)	Best Actress	Mia Wasikowska	Nominated
Venice Film Festival (70th)	Golden Lion	John Curran	Nominated
