= Afterburn (1992 film) =

1992 American made-for-TV film

- Genre: Drama
- Written by: Elizabeth Chandler
- Directed by: Robert Markowitz
- Starring: Laura Dern; Robert Loggia; Michael Rooker; Vincent Spano
- Music by: Stewart Copeland
- Country of origin: United States
- Original language: English

Production
- Executive producer: Steve Tisch
- Producers: Paul Kurta; Elizabeth Chandler
- Cinematography: Isidore Mankofsky
- Editor: Jerrold L. Ludwig
- Running time: 103 min.
- Production company: HBO Pictures

Original release
- Network: HBO
- Release: May 30, 1992

Afterburn is a 1992 drama film written and produced for television, based on a true story where one woman takes on the United States military and General Dynamics, manufacturer of the F-16 jet fighter aircraft that took her husband's life. The docudrama starred Laura Dern, Robert Loggia, and Vincent Spano. The film's name is derived from the "Afterburner" bar where the central character (Janet Harduvel), who works as a waitress, met her future husband, a setting that forms the focus of the first part of the film.

== Plot ==
On November 15, 1982, Janet Harduvel (Laura Dern) is devastated by the news of the death of her husband Ted (Vincent Spano) who flew as a United States Air Force pilot in one of the world's most sophisticated fighter aircraft, the General Dynamics F-16 Fighting Falcon. (Note: Although accurately portrayed as primarily a fighter aircraft in the 1980s, the F-16 eventually evolved into a multirole combat aircraft.) She is stymied in finding out the truth behind his crash in Korea and takes on the US military and General Dynamics, maker of the F-16. With the help of her lawyer, Leo Morrone (Robert Loggia), and her sister Mary (Welker White), Harduvel begins the long process of unraveling the lies and deception that are behind a joint military and General Dynamics cover-up that blames the accident on pilot error. Despite setbacks, she proves to be unwavering in her search for the truth to clear his name and uncover the deadly secret buried in the F-16.

== Cast ==
As appearing in screen credits (main roles identified):

Actor	Role
Laura Dern	Janet Harduvel
Robert Loggia	Leo Morrone
Vincent Spano	Captain Ted "Hardball" Harduvel (Note: U.S. military pilots are typically identified by their "call sign". Captain Harduvel was actually known as "Gamble".)
Michael Rooker	Captain Casey "Z" Zankowski
Welker White	Mary Sciales
Richard Jenkins	Acton Ryder
Andy Romano	Dr. Carl Haller
Basil Wallace	Captain Terry "Joker" North
Gary Basaraba	Bill Decker
Dion Anderson	Colonel Hewson
Kasi Lemmons	Carol North
Daniel Benzali	Colonel John Patterson
Cassy Friel	Kiki Harduvel
Christopher John Fields	Charlie Reeves
Lewis Dix Jr.	Joe

The F-16 was depicted as a protagonist in the film.

== Production ==
Captain Theodore T. Harduvel's widow, Janet, was the focus of the production and her assistance was paramount in presenting an accurate portrait of the struggle to clear her husband's memory and legacy. In 1987, Janet Harduvel won a $3.1 million jury award against General Dynamics Corporation, alleging a flight instrumentation malfunction due to a short circuit caused by frayed ("chafed") wiring, led to his crash. The verdict would "ultimately be overturned, not on its merits, but on the basis that federal defense contractors enjoy blanket immunity from such lawsuits." A subsequent defeat on appeal followed. Harduvel's attorney, Howard Acosta, said he was particularly baffled because the original award was taken away "as a result of a law that was not in effect at the time of our trial."

When producer Steve Tisch saw a 60 Minutes segment on Harduvel's legal fight, after working with her on a proposal, he pitched the film to Disney, originally titled, "The Janet Harduvel Story." At the height of the Gulf War, the feature was in pre-production when Disney reassessed the optics of releasing an anti-military film, and backed out. HBO quickly picked up the project, but only offered a fraction of the original budget of $14 million. Tisch said, "HBO said they wanted to make the movie, but I would have less than $5 million to make it. It was exactly the same movie, but it all worked out." Janet Harduvel appeared in an uncredited cameo role, and acted as a creative consultant on the film. Harduvel's real-life attorney, aviation specialist, Howard M. Acosta Sr., assisted by attorney Charles Price and investigator Myron Pappadakis, were together changed into the fictional attorney Leo Marrone. Harduvel's sister, Marybeth, was the basis for the film's Mary Sciales. (Note: After the film, Janet went back to using her maiden name, and became famous as Tampa, Florida's on-air astrologer, aka "The Star Goddess" on WLLD-FM 98.7.)

The technical issues that are dealt with in Afterburn is that the F-16 "Viper" (Note: Although the F-16's official name is "Fighting Falcon", it is known to its pilots as the "Viper", due to it resembling a viper snake and after the popular contemporary Colonial Viper starfighter from the Battlestar Galactica TV series.) is entirely reliant on its electrical systems to relay flight commands as well as digital instrument reading, instead of traditional analog instruments and mechanically-linked controls, leading to the early moniker of "the electric jet". In Capt. Harduvel's final mission, he relied on his faulty instrument reading that showed him close to terrain, but did not indicate that he was upside down and his "pull out" actually propelled him at full power, inverted, into a hillside. General Dynamics was aware of a potential problem of wiring becoming chafed by the high-G forces inherent in the F-16's flight envelope, and had a maintenance advisory issued.

A dramatic tension was created with Harduvel pitted against the secrets buried deep in the miles-long wiring that eventually was proved to be the reason for a series of F-16 crashes. Principal photography took place in southern California, although the production had no access to USAF bases, the ingenious use of a solitary "mocked-up" F-16 fighter and USAF fighters created by the special effects team of Stargate Films, were seamlessly blended into the film. A number of evocative images by Isidore Mankofsky of the F-16 are used for effect, later to be recognized by an Emmy nomination for his cinematography. Also notable is the music by Stewart Copeland, best-known to the public as the drummer for the British band The Police, but who also was a very successful composer with an extensive career in films and TV productions.

== Reception ==
Originally aired in the United States by HBO on May 30, 1992, Afterburn was re-broadcast in October that year and released shortly after as a home video in both VHS and DVD formats. Although not garnering a great deal of attention from critics, most reviews were favorable, centering on the drama in the story. Ken Tucker considered that the film, dedicated to the memory of Ted Harduvel, was successful because of "complex performances of Spano and, especially, Dern—they give 'Afterburn' the emotional weight its real-life subjects deserve." Sandra Brennan called it "... riveting, fact-based made-for-cable drama."

=== Awards ===
Afterburn received a number of nominations in various categories including Molly Lopata nominated for the "Artios" Best Casting for TV Movie of the Week for the 1992 Casting Society of America Award, Isidore Mankofsky for Outstanding Individual Achievement in Cinematography for a 1992 Emmy in the Miniseries or a Special category and Jerrold L. Ludwig for Outstanding Individual Achievement in the 1992 Emmy for Editing for a Miniseries or a Special - Single Camera Production, as well as for editing in the Best Edited Television Special category for the 1993 American Cinema Editors, USA Award.

Although Laura Dern was nominated for the 1992 Emmy for Outstanding Lead Actress in a Miniseries or a Special, but was unsuccessful, she went on to win a 1993 Golden Globe Award for the Best Performance by an Actress in a Mini-Series or Motion Picture Made for TV category.
