= We Don't Live Here Anymore =

2004 drama film by John Curran

- Theatrical poster
- Directed by: John Curran
- Screenplay by: Larry Gross
- Based on: "We Don't Live Here Anymore" and "Adultery" by Andre Dubus
- Produced by: Harvey Kahn; Jonas Goodman; Naomi Watts
- Starring: Mark Ruffalo; Laura Dern; Peter Krause; Naomi Watts
- Cinematography: Maryse Alberti
- Edited by: Alexandre De Franceschi
- Music by: Michael Convertino
- Production company: Front Street Pictures
- Distributed by: Warner Independent Pictures
- Release dates: January 20, 2004 (Sundance Film Festival); August 13, 2004 (limited)
- Running time: 101 minutes
- Countries: United States; Canada
- Language: English
- Budget: $2-3 million
- Box office: $3.3 million

We Don't Live Here Anymore is a 2004 drama film directed by John Curran and starring Mark Ruffalo, Laura Dern, Peter Krause, and Naomi Watts. It is based on the short stories "We Don't Live Here Anymore" and "Adultery" by Andre Dubus.

Set in Washington state, the film was shot around Vancouver, British Columbia, Canada. It premiered at the 2004 Sundance Film Festival, where it was honored with the Waldo Salt Award for Best Screenplay. Warner Independent Pictures gave the film a limited release in theaters on August 13, 2004.

== Plot ==
Jack Linden and Hank Evans are two friends who teach literature at the local university. One night Jack and his wife Terry are hosting Hank and his wife Edith for a dinner party. Jack and Edith leave the party to get beer and are revealed to be having an affair. When Jack returns, a drunken Terry accuses Jack of having an affair with Edith and claims that the beer run was just a cover. Jack angrily denies any infidelity, but Terry briefly throws him out of the house. The next morning, Terry apologizes for her behavior and says that she will stop drinking. The couple's two young kids, Sean and Natasha, say they heard their parents fighting, but Jack tells them all grownups fight once in a while.

Jack and Edith continue their affair, meeting up for trysts in the woods and at motels. Terry surmises that an affair is still happening, but she does not suspect Edith of being the other woman. During Edith's absences, Hank tries to resume work on a novel after being met with multiple rejections from publishers. One day, Jack and Hank meet up at a bar where they talk about their marriages. Hank confesses that he still has feelings for a woman he was with before he married Edith and hopes to run in to her one day. Jack asks him why he is still married to Edith when he loves another woman, but Hank scoffs at the idea of leaving, reasoning that people should have at least one affair.

Terry and Jack's marriage suffers further strain. As a way of assuaging his guilt, Jack brings up the possibility to his wife that she herself is having an affair with Hank. Terry admits that on the night he and Edith left to go get beer, Hank drunkenly confessed to her that he doesn't love his wife, before attempting to kiss her. Terry says she did not reciprocate and that she would never betray her best friend Edith like that, but Jack continues to hold the incident above her. One day, Terry is walking downtown when she sees Hank getting ice cream with his daughter Sharon. Though Hank says he is celebrating the publication of his poem in The New Yorker, he does not look happy and Terry tries to cheer him up on his accomplishment. Hank asks her not to tell Jack about the publishing news before he does.

Hank and Terry embark on an affair of their own. Jack catches Terry coming back home one night and she admits she was with Hank. She accuses Jack of setting the whole thing up and pushing her towards him. At a party to celebrate Hank getting published, Hank and Terry leave together, which is observed by Edith and Jack. Back at the Linden home, things come to a head between Jack and Terry and, after a fight, he confesses he is in love with Edith. A devastated Terry asks Jack when he will be leaving, and he says he does not know yet.

Terry spends the whole night cleaning instead of coming to bed. The following morning, the kids greet Jack in bed and express their fears that their parents are divorcing. He takes the kids out biking in the woods while Terry stays behind to pack Jack's bags. When Jack returns to see his packed suitcase, he breaks down and expresses to Terry that he does not want to leave. He and Terry decide to work on their marriage and reconcile.

That night, Terry tells Jack that Edith is planning on telling Hank about the affair, if she hasn't already. Jack goes to Hank's house to talk with the couple, but Hank, who appears to not be upset, exits the conversation and says he's going to the movies. Jack confronts Hank and realizes his friend was aware of the affair the whole time, hence his nonchalant attitude. Jack goes back in the house and he and Edith embrace for a final time before he leaves. When Hank returns home, Edith tells him that she and Sharon will be staying at her mother's for a while. When Hank asks why since he's already forgiven her affair, she says she's leaving because she can.

== Cast ==
- Mark Ruffalo as Jack Linden
- Laura Dern as Terry Linden
- Peter Krause as Hank Evans
- Naomi Watts as Edith Evans
- Sam Charles as Sean Linden
- Ginger Page as Natasha Linden
- Jennifer Bishop as Sharon Evans
- Amber Rothwell as Lauren

== Production ==
Naomi Watts, who had been longtime friends with director John Curran, had the choice of lead roles. She declined to play Terry because she had just finished filming "the emotionally draining" 21 Grams. Laura Dern had initial reservations about playing Terry, saying "I was halfway through the script, I thought, 'OK, I’ve read this before. This is a great part, but the guy has this ogre wife and he’s about to get into this affair. They're obviously going to run off together and I'll be this boorish character who ends up alone.'" However, Curran convinced Dern that the character and her relationship with Jack would be more complex.

The film was shot in 30 days.

== Reception ==
=== Release ===
We Don’t Live Here Anymore premiered in January 2004 at the Sundance Film Festival, where it won the Waldo Salt Screenwriting Award for Larry Gross.

Following its premiere at Sundance, Warner Independent Pictures acquired North American and the U.K. distribution rights for $2 million, including backend profits, with Miramax Films and Newmarket Films also bidding for the film. It was then given a limited release on August 13, 2004.

=== Critical response ===
On the review aggregate website Rotten Tomatoes, We Don’t Live Here Anymore has an approval rating of 65% based on 127 reviews. Its consensus states, "We Don't Live Here Anymore is often overly moody and grim, but it's made watchable by the strong performances of its four principal actors." Metacritic, which uses a weighted average, assigned the film a score of 66 out of 100, based on 37 critics, indicating "generally favorable" reviews.

Writing for Variety, Todd McCarthy said "Ruffalo, in his underplayed manner, fully reveals the man in all his desires, hesitations and heartaches in relation to both his wife and lover. He's matched exceptionally well by the shimmering Watts, who once again displays her quicksilver acting ability to slip from one telling mood to the next. She has superb moments here."

In his review, Roger Ebert was more critical, writing the film's problem is "that it's too desultory. Maybe the point of the Dubus stories was to show perfunctory transgressions between characters not sufficiently motivated to accept the consequences. They approach adultery the way they might approach a treadmill, jumping on, punching the speed and incline buttons, working up a sweat, coming back down to level, slowing to a walk, and then deciding the damn thing isn't worth the trouble." However, he added, "What must be said is that the actors are better than the material. There are four specific people here, each one closely observed and carefully realized. Ruffalo's Jack, driven by his lust, finds his needs fascinating to himself; Naomi Watts' Edith finds them fascinating to her. Terry and Hank seem almost forced into their halfhearted affair, and Laura Dern and Peter Krause are precise in the way they show dutiful excitement in each other's presence, while Dern vibrates with anger and passion in her arguments with her husband."

The film was compared to Closer, which was released the same year and also dealt with themes of infidelity amongst two couples. William Thomas of Empire said We Don't Live Here Anymore lacked the wit of the former, while The List's Kaleem Aftab said We Don't Live Here is the better of the two films, adding "it's the relationship that doesn't involve sex between Jack and Hank that is the real clincher. Their games of one-upmanship and bravado fizzle with a kinetic tension as they strive harder to demonstrate their manhood to each other than to their wives, while it's the women who hold the trump cards and the bigger balls".

In Creative Loafing, Felicia Feaster wrote, "The way adultery unfolds in We Don’t Live Here Anymore suggests it is less an expression of female will and desire as something men let happen to their wives out of indulgent boredom in Hank's case, or repressed rage in Jack's."

=== Accolades ===
Laura Dern won Best Supporting Actress at the Boston Society of Film Critics Awards, in a tie with Sharon Warren for Ray.
