= Robyn Davidson =

Australian writer (born 1950)

Robyn Davidson OAM
- Born: 6 September 1950 (age 76); Miles, Queensland, Australia
- Occupation: Writer

Robyn Davidson is an Australian writer best known for her 1980 book Tracks, about her 2,700 km (1,700 miles) trek across the deserts of Western Australia using camels. Her career of travelling and writing about her travels has spanned 40 years. Her memoir, Unfinished Woman was published in late 2023.

== Early life and education ==
Robyn Davidson was born at Stanley Park, a cattle station in Miles, Queensland, the second of two girls. When she was 11 years old, her mother took her own life, and she was raised largely by her unmarried aunt (her father's sister), Gillian, and attended a girls' boarding school in Brisbane. She received a music scholarship but did not take it up. In Brisbane, Davidson shared a house with biologists and studied zoology.

In 1968, aged 18, she went to Sydney and later lived a bohemian life in a Sydney Push household at Paddington, while working as a card-dealer at an illegal gambling house.

In 1975, Davidson moved to Alice Springs in an effort to work with camels for a desert trek she was planning. For two years, she trained camels and learned how to survive in the harsh desert. In her final year in Alice Springs, she was assisted by Sallay Mahomet, who provided her with the required camels. Davidson said later that she would often recall Mahomet's advice and warnings, especially when faced with the ferocity of in-season wild camels eyeing her herd. Mahomet also provided her with two camels, Kate and Zeleika; Kate would not go on the upcoming journey due to a serious skin infection, which Davidson attempted to nurse for several months. During this period she was peripherally involved in the Aboriginal land rights movement.

== Tracks ==
In 1977, Davidson set off for Australia's west coast from Alice Springs, with her dog Diggitty and four camels: Dookie (a large male), Bub (a smaller male), Zeleika (a wild female), and Goliath (Zeleika's offspring). She had no intention of writing about the journey, but eventually agreed to write an article for the magazine National Geographic. Having met the photographer Rick Smolan in Alice Springs, she insisted that he be the photographer for the journey. Smolan, with whom she had an "on-again off-again" romantic relationship during the trip, drove out to meet her three times during the nine-month journey.

The National Geographic article was published in 1978 and attracted so much interest that Davidson decided to write a book about the experience. She travelled to London and lived with Doris Lessing while writing Tracks. Tracks won the inaugural Thomas Cook Travel Book Award in 1980, and the Blind Society Award. In 1992, Smolan published his pictures of the trip in the book From Alice to Ocean. It included the first interactive story-and-photo CD made for the general public.

It has been suggested that one of the reasons Tracks was so popular, particularly with women, is that Davidson "places herself in the wilderness of her own accord, rather than as an adjunct to a man".

Her desert journey is remembered by Aboriginal Australians she encountered along the way. Artist Jean Burke remembers Robyn in a painting called The Camel Lady, which was produced in 2011 for a Warakurna Artists' exhibition in Darwin. Burke's father Mr Eddie, a Pitjantjatjara man, had trekked through Ngaanyatjarra lands with Davidson, guiding her to water sources along the way. Mr Eddie originally planned to accompany Davidson for a short period, a few days, between Docker River and Pipalyatjara to help her respectfully bypass sacred sites; however he ultimately accompanied her to Warburton. Being accompanied by Mr Eddie results in Davidson's timeline for completion of the trek having to be altered. She says of this:

I was being torn by two different time concepts. I knew which one made sense, but the other one was fighting hard for survival. Structure, regimentation, orderedness. Which had absolutely nothing to do with anything. I kept thinking wryly to myself, “Christ, if this keeps up it will take us months to get there. So what? Is this a marathon or what? This is going to be the best part of your trip, having Eddie with you, so stretch it out, idiot, stretch it out. But but…what about routine?” and so on. The turmoil lasted all that day, but gradually faded as I relaxed into Eddie’s time. He was teaching me something about flow, about choosing the right moment for everything, about enjoying the present. I let him take over.

— Robyn Davidson, Tracks, Chapter 9

After their arrival in Warburton Davidson and Mr Eddie part company and Mr Eddie suggests that another older Aboriginal man accompany her on the next leg of the journey as the next sections will be difficult. Davidson decided that she wanted to do it on her own.

=== Film adaptation ===
2013 saw the release of a film adaptation of Davidson's book, also called Tracks, directed by John Curran and starring Mia Wasikowska. It made its debut at the Venice Film Festival.

== Nomads ==
The majority of Davidson's work has involved travelling with and studying nomadic peoples. In The Age newspaper, Jane Sullivan wrote that, "while she is often called a social anthropologist", she had no academic qualifications and said that she was "completely self-taught". Davidson's experiences with nomads include travelling on migration with nomads in India from 1990 to 1992. Those experiences were published in Desert Places.

She has studied different forms of the nomad lifestyle — including those in Australia, India, and Tibet — for a book and a documentary series. Her writing on nomads is based mainly on personal experience, and she brings many of her thoughts together in No Fixed Address, her contribution to the Quarterly Essay series. Sullivan wrote about that work:

One of the questions we need to ask, if we are to have a future, she says, is "Where did we cause less damage to ourselves, to our environment, and to our animal kin?" One answer is: when we were nomadic. "It is when we settled that we became strangers in a strange land, and wandering took on the quality of banishment," she writes, and then later adds: "I shall probably be accused of romanticism".

== Awards ==
Davidson was awarded the Medal of the Order of Australia (OAM) in the King's Birthday Honours List in June 2024.

== In popular culture ==
Davidson is the subject of a song written by Irish folk singer and songwriter Mick Hanly. The song, "Crusader", was recorded by Mary Black on her 1983 self-titled album.

In 2024, Davidson was interviewed by Indira Naidoo for episode 9 of the 38th series of Compass on ABCTV

== Personal life ==
For three years in the 1980s she was in a relationship with the Indian novelist, Salman Rushdie, to whom she was introduced by their mutual friend, Bruce Chatwin.

Davidson has moved frequently, and has had homes in Sydney, London, and India.

== Bibliography ==
=== Books ===
- Tracks (Vintage, 1980)
- Australia: Beyond the Dreamtime (co-author with Thomas Keneally and Patsy Adam Smith) (Facts on File, 1987)
- Desert Places, Pastoral Nomads in India (Penguin, 1987)
- Ancestors: A Novel (Simon and Schuster, 1990)
- From Alice to Ocean: Alone Across the Outback (Addison Wesley Publishing Company, 1992)
- Travelling Light, a collection of essays (Harpercollins, 1993)
- The Picador Book of Journeys (Picador, 2002)
- Unfinished Woman (Bloomsbury, 2023)

=== Essays ===
- Marrying Eddie in Granta, Vol. 70, Summer 2000
- The First Sense in Granta, Vol. 76, Jan 10, 2002
- No Fixed Address: Nomads and the Fate of the Planet in Quarterly Essay, Issue 24, 2006
- Self Portrait with Imaginary Mother in Brick (magazine), No. 68, Fall 2001

=== Screenplays ===
- Mail Order Bride (1987 feature film for Australian Broadcasting Corporation)

== Sources ==
- Falkiner, Suzanne (1992). Wilderness. Writers' Landscape. East Roseville: Simon and Schuster.
