= John Curran (director) =

American film director and screenwriter

- Born: September 11, 1960 (age 65); Utica, New York, U.S.
- Occupation(s): Film director, screenwriter

John Curran (born September 11, 1960) is an American film director and screenwriter.

== Life and career ==
Born in Utica, New York, Curran studied illustration and design at Syracuse University, then worked as an illustrator, graphic designer, and production designer in Manhattan before moving to Sydney, Australia in 1986. There he worked on television commercials before writing and directing the short film Down Rusty Down. For his debut feature film, the 1998 drama Praise, he was nominated for the Australian Film Institute Award for Best Direction and won the Film Critics Circle of Australia Award for Best Director and the International Critics' Award at the Toronto International Film Festival.

Six years passed before Curran tackled his next project, the independent film We Don't Live Here Anymore, for which he was nominated for the Grand Special Prize at the Deauville American Film Festival and the Grand Jury Prize at the Sundance Film Festival. He followed this two years later with The Painted Veil, the third screen adaptation of the 1925 novel by W. Somerset Maugham.

He wrote the screenplay for The Killer Inside Me, the second film adaptation of the 1952 novel by Jim Thompson. Directed by Michael Winterbottom and starring Jessica Alba, Kate Hudson, Casey Affleck, and Bill Pullman, it was filmed in Oklahoma. He also is set to direct The Beautiful and Damned, a Zelda and F. Scott Fitzgerald biopic starring Keira Knightley. In October 2012, he began filming an adaptation of Robyn Davidson's Tracks, starring Mia Wasikowska, in Australia.

He lives in Pittsford, New York.

== Filmography ==
Film

Year	Title	Director	Writer	Notes
1996	Down Rusty Down	Yes	Yes	Short film
1998	Praise	Yes	No	
2004	We Don't Live Here Anymore	Yes	No	
2006	The Painted Veil	Yes	No	Also executive producer
2010	Stone	Yes	No	
2010	The Killer Inside Me	No	Yes	
2013	Tracks	Yes	No	
2017	Chappaquiddick	Yes	No	
2023	Mercy Road	Yes	Yes	

Television

Year	Title	Episode(s)
2005	The L Word	"L'Chlaim"
2019	Bloom	"The Memory Box"
2019	Bloom	"Back to Life"
2019	Bloom	"Redemption"
2021	Eden	"Scout"
2021	Eden	"Cora & Damian"
2021	Eden	"Andy"
2025	The Last Frontier	"Winds of Change"
2025	The Last Frontier	"American Dream"
2025	The Last Frontier	"Arnaq"
2025	The Last Frontier	"L’air Perdu"
