= Themes and plot devices in Hitchcock films =

Alfred Hitchcock's films show an interesting tendency towards recurring themes and plot devices throughout his life as a director.

== Suspense ==
Hitchcock preferred the use of suspense over the use of surprise in his films. For surprise, the director assaults the viewer with frightening things. For suspense, the director tells or shows the audience things that the characters in the film do not know and then artfully builds tension around what will happen when the characters finally learn the truth. Hitchcock often used public places as scenes to heighten terror and suspense. Hitchcock was fond of illustrating this point with a short aphorism – "There's two people having breakfast and there's a bomb under the table. If it explodes, that's a surprise. But if it doesn't..."

== Audience as voyeur ==
Further blurring the moral distinction between the innocent and the guilty, occasionally making this indictment inescapably clear to viewers one and all, Hitchcock also makes voyeurs of his "respectable" audience. In Rear Window (1954), after L. B. Jeffries (played by James Stewart) has been staring across the courtyard at him for most of the film, Lars Thorwald (played by Raymond Burr) confronts Jeffries by saying, "What do you want of me?" Burr might as well have been addressing the audience. Shortly before asking this, Thorwald turns to face the camera directly for the first time.

Similarly, Psycho begins with the camera moving toward a hotel-room window, through which the audience is introduced to Marion Crane (Janet Leigh) and her divorced boyfriend Sam Loomis played by John Gavin. They are partially undressed, having seemingly had premarital sex, and Marion is supposed to be on her lunch hour. Later, along with Norman Bates (portrayed by Anthony Perkins), the audience watches Marion undress through a peephole.

== MacGuffin ==
One of Hitchcock's favorite devices for driving the plots of his stories and creating suspense was what he called the "MacGuffin". The Oxford English Dictionary, however, credits Hitchcock's friend, the Scottish screenwriter Angus MacPhail, as being the true inventor of the term.

Hitchcock himself defined the term in a 1962 interview conducted by François Truffaut, published as Hitchcock/Truffaut (Simon and Schuster, 1967). Hitchcock used this plot device extensively. Many of his suspense films use this device: a detail that, by inciting curiosity and desire, drives the plot and motivates the characters' actions within the story. However, the specific identity of the item is unimportant to the plot.

State secrets of various kinds serve as MacGuffins in several of the spy films, especially his earlier British films The Man Who Knew Too Much, The 39 Steps, and The Lady Vanishes. Hitchcock has stated that the best MacGuffin, or as he put it, "the emptiest," was the one used in North By Northwest, which was referred to as "government secrets."

== Sexuality ==
For their time, Hitchcock's films were regarded as sexualized, often dealing with perverse and taboo behaviors. Sometimes, the modest conventions of his era caused him to convey sexuality in an emblematic fashion, such as in North by Northwest, when the film cuts abruptly from two aroused but visually chaste lovers to a train entering a tunnel.

Hitchcock found several ways to convey sexuality without depicting graphic behaviors, such as the substitution of explicit sexual passion with the passionate consumption of food. In a particularly amusing scene in Psycho, Norman Bates (Anthony Perkins) carries on a conversation with Marion Crane (Janet Leigh) while one of his hands strokes a dead animal and the other hand lingers on his crotch. Sexual feelings are often strongly associated with violent behavior. In The Lodger and Psycho, this association is the basis of the whole film. The taboo subject of homosexuality is evoked in both Rope and Strangers on a Train, while some have read Rear Window as dealing with fetishistic voyeurism and Hitchcock himself analogized specific scenes in Vertigo to necrophilia. Biographers have noted how Hitchcock continued to challenge film censorship throughout his career until he was allowed to show nudity in Frenzy.

== Blonde women ==
Hitchcock had a dramatic preference for blonde women, stating that the audience would be more suspicious of a brunette. Many of these blondes were of the Grace Kelly variety: perfect, aloof ice goddesses with a hidden red-hot inner fire. Hitchcock said he used blonde actresses in his films, not because of an attraction to them but because of a tradition that began with silent star Mary Pickford. The director said that blondes were "a symbol of the heroine." He also thought they photographed better in black and white, the predominant film for most dramas for many years.

== Punishing women ==
Hitchcock had many strong female characters within his movies, career women, who often triumphed over men and subverted sexual stereotypes. There is a commonly held view that Hitchcock treated women poorly, including the examples given by Tippi Hedren in The Birds. One view suggests that Hitchcock’s films enacted “rituals of defilement” of women that evoked his fear of women and unconsciously defended against that fear by punishing and even killing them.
