= Conflict in Vietnam and at Home =

1968 speech by U.S. Senator Robert F. Kennedy

"Conflict in Vietnam and at Home" was a speech given on March 18, 1968, by U.S. Senator Robert F. Kennedy at Kansas State University. Having only declared his candidacy for president two days before, the address was Kennedy's first official campaign speech. He discussed student protests, consequences of the Vietnam War, and Lyndon B. Johnson's leadership of the country.

== Background ==
On March 16, 1968, Senator Robert F. Kennedy declared his candidacy for the Presidency. At 9:00 a.m. on March 18, Kennedy arrived at Kansas State University in Manhattan, Kansas, to give his first campaign speech. As a Landon Lecture, it had been scheduled long beforehand. In choosing Kansas State for his first appearance, Kennedy's campaign was hoping to attract a large number of student volunteers in a politically diverse region.

== The speech ==
The 50 minute speech was written by Adam Walinsky. It was delivered in Ahearn Fieldhouse, where about 14,000 students had gathered.

=== Summary ===
Kennedy was anxious and unsure how the young crowd would receive him. He informally opened with a joke on the planned Vietnam Commission:

The problem was that the President and I couldn't agree who should be on the commission. I wanted Senator Mansfield, Senator Fulbright, and Senator Morse appointed to the commission. And the President, in his own inimitable style, wanted to appoint General Westmoreland, John Wayne, and Martha Raye.

The crowd was surprised by this humor but received it well. Kennedy then began his written speech with a quote from Kansas native William Allen White:

If our colleges and universities do not breed men who riot, who rebel, who attack life with all the youthful vision and vigor, then there is something wrong with our colleges. The more riots that come out of our college campuses the better the world for tomorrow.

This was also well received. He nervously continues on with his speech, stammering in a few places while his right leg shook. He gained more confidence as the audience became more enthusiastic. About ten minutes in, Kennedy began discussing President Lyndon B. Johnson's foreign policy and the Vietnam War:

I am concerned that at the end of it all, there will only be more Americans killed; more of our treasure spilled out; and because of the bitterness and hatred on every side in this war, more hundreds of thousands of Vietnamese slaughtered; so that they may say, as Tacitus said of Rome: "They made a desert, and called it peace." I don't think that is satisfactory for the United States of America.

The audience cheered. With his emotion increasing, Kennedy admitted his role in the escalation of the war:

...I am willing to bear my share of the responsibility, before history and my fellow citizens. But past error is no excuse for its own perpetuation. Tragedy is a tool for the living to gain wisdom, not a guide by which to live. Now as ever, we do ourselves best justice when we measure ourselves against ancient tests, as in the Antigone of Sophocles: "All men make mistakes, but a good man yields when he knows his course is wrong, and repairs the evil. The only sin is pride." If the South Vietnamese troops will not carry the fight for their own cities, we cannot ourselves destroy them. That kind of salvation is not an act we can presume to perform for them. For we must ask our government, and we must ask ourselves: where does such logic end? If it becomes necessary to destroy all of South Vietnam to save it, will we do that too? (Note: This was in reference to an article by Peter Arnett on the town of Bến Tre in the aftermath of the Tet Offensive, in which an anonymous American major was quoted as saying, "It became necessary to destroy the town to save it.") And if we care so little about South Vietnam, that we are willing to see its land destroyed, and its people dead, then are we there in the first place?

Kennedy then approached the climax of his speech, raising his right fist into the air and speaking fervently:

So I come here today, to this great university, to ask your help; not for me, but for your country, and for the people of Vietnam...I urge you to learn the harsh facts that lurk behind the mask of official illusion with which we have concealed our true circumstances, even from ourselves. Our country is in danger: not just from foreign enemies, but, above all, from our own misguided policies — and what they can do to the nation that Thomas Jefferson once said was the last, best hope of man. There is a contest on, not only for the rule of America, but for the heart of America. In these next eight months we are going to decide what this country will stand for — and what kind of men we are. So I ask of for your help, in the cities and homes of this state, into the towns and farms, contributing your concern and action, warning of the danger of what we are doing and the promise of what we can do in the future...

Kennedy looked up from his written text and improvised the final part of his speech:

...not just in Southeast Asia, but here at home as well, so that we might have a new birth for this country, a new light to guide us. And I pledge to you, if you will give me your help, if you will give me your hand, I will work for you, and we will have a new America.

The crowd cheered wildly. Hundreds of students surrounded Kennedy as he attempted to leave, scratching his hands and pulling off his cuff links. Photographer Stanley Tretick, surprised by the hysteria, exclaimed, "This is Kansas, fucking Kansas! He's going all the fucking way!"

== Aftermath ==
Kennedy continued on to Lawrence later that afternoon, where he would give another speech at the University of Kansas, incorporating many of the same elements in the first one. The speech is included in Kansas State University's Landon Lecture Series.

Kennedy's presidential campaign was ended abruptly two months later following his assassination.
