= Effie T. Battle =

American poet and educator

Effie T. Battle (c. 1882 – after 1940) was an African-American poet and educator. The wife of Wallace A. Battle, she served as President of Okolona College from 1927 to 1933, succeeding her husband.

== Life ==
Battle was born in Okolona in 1882. Her mother was one-quarter Choctaw. She earned a bachelor’s degree from Rust College. She married Wallace Battle in 1903 and taught teacher education and grammar at Okolona. She published a book of poetry, Gleanings from Dixieland, in 1914. Wallace Battle resigned as President of Okolona and moved North in 1927 following the murder of a teacher on campus. After leading the school for several years, Effie Battle rejoined her husband, living the rest of her life in New York and Connecticut.

Effie and Wallace Battle had four children, one of them the psychoanalyst Marie Battle Singer.

== Selected works ==
Gleanings from Dixieland, Tuskegee Institute, AL. 1914.
