= Marie Battle Singer =

First black UK psychoanalyst

- Born: 1910; Okolona, Mississippi, U.S.
- Died: 1985 (aged 74–75)
- Education: Boston University (B.A.); Smith College (MSW); University of London (PhD, 1961)
- Father: Wallace A. Battle

Marie Battle Singer (1910–1985) was an American-British psychotherapist, and the United Kingdom's first Black psychoanalyst.

She was born in 1910 into a family of educators in Okolona, Mississippi. Her father was Wallace A. Battle, founder of the Okolona Industrial School. The Okolona Industrial School and Battle himself were the targets of racist harassment and violence in the 1920s, culminating in the murder of one of the school's teachers; the family fled North in the late 1920s. Marie earned a bachelor's degree in English literature at Boston University, then joined her family in New York City, where she led a youth program at a Black YWCA chapter, among other jobs. Racism limited her employment opportunities. She was briefly married, changing her last name to Wills.

She completed a master's degree in social work at Smith College, then, in 1948, took a job with the International Refugee Organization in Germany, where she helped to administer programs for refugee children. In Europe she found a sense of freedom that she hadn't experienced in the United States. In Germany she became aware of the work of Anna Freud, and in 1950 she moved to London to study at Freud's Hampstead Clinic, where she qualified in 1954 and worked as a therapist for several years. In the 1950s she also wrote a series of articles on adolescence for The Observer.

Through Karin Stephen, Singer socialized with the Bloomsbury Group, where she met her second husband, the poet and marine biologist Burns Singer. In 1959, the couple moved to Cambridge, where she was the only practising child psychotherapist at the time. She completed a PhD at the University of London in 1961. In addition to treating patients (in private practice and at Middlesex Hospital's Department of Child Psychiatry), she was a Research Fellow at Clare Hall and taught in Cambridge's Experimental Psychology department. She also conducted seminars for doctors in the Cambridge area, bringing new practitioners into psychiatry and psychoanalysis. Burns Singer died in 1964. After several years of declining health, Marie Battle Singer died in 1985. Clare Hall has a scholarship fund in her name.
