= Landon Lecture Series =

Lectures at Kansas State University, US

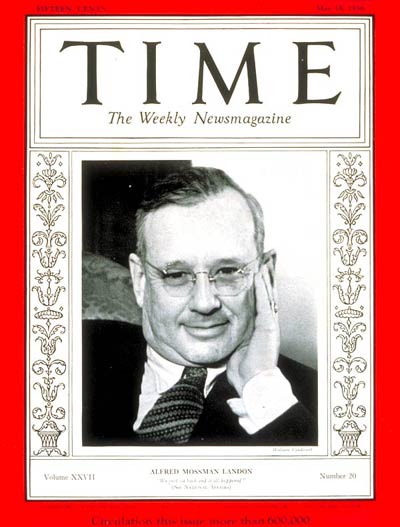
The namesake of the series, Alf Landon, on the cover of Time magazine, May 18, 1936

The Alfred M. Landon Lecture Series is a series of speeches on current public affairs, which is organized and hosted by Kansas State University, in Manhattan, Kansas, United States. It is named after Kansas politician Alf Landon, former Governor of Kansas and Republican presidential candidate. The first lecture in the series was given by Landon on December 13, 1966.

The lecture series has been described as "prestigious," and Eric Lichtblau noted in his 2008 book Bush's Law: The Remaking of American Justice that the "Landon Lecture Series has provided an unlikely but powerful platform allowing world leaders, from Ronald Reagan and Mikhail Gorbachev to Jimmy Carter and Henry Kissinger, to expound on the critical public issues of the day."

Among the speakers who have delivered Landon Lectures are ten Nobel laureates, eight Pulitzer Prize-winners, and more than 40 Presidential Medal of Freedom recipients.

Every U.S. President from the founding of the series in 1966 to 2008 delivered a Landon lecture, excepting only Lyndon B. Johnson. George W. Bush (2006), Ronald Reagan (1982) and Richard Nixon (1970) delivered speeches during their tenure in office. Bill Clinton (2007), Jimmy Carter (1991) and Gerald Ford (1978) spoke after leaving office. George H. W. Bush delivered a Landon Lecture while serving as vice president of the United States in 1985, before being elected to the presidency. Before Reagan delivered his Landon Lecture as U.S. president in 1982, he previously spoke in the series in 1967, while governor of California.

Other sitting U.S. federal officials to speak in the series include: Vice President Walter Mondale; Senate Majority Leader Mike Mansfield; Minority Leaders Hugh Scott, Howard Baker and Tom Daschle; House Speakers Tip O'Neill and Jim Wright; Supreme Court justices Sandra Day O’Connor and Sonia Sotomayor; and Attorney General Janet Reno. In addition, nine current or former foreign heads of state have also spoken in the series, including former Soviet Premier Mikhail Gorbachev, former British Prime Minister Harold Wilson, former Malawian President Joyce Banda, and former Mexican President Ernesto Zedillo.

== Robert F. Kennedy (1968) ==
U.S. Senator Robert F. Kennedy was one of twenty-two active U.S. Senators to deliver a lecture in the series (including also his brother Ted Kennedy in 1984). Kennedy's speech on March 18, 1968, "Conflict in Vietnam and at Home", is notable for being the first speech Kennedy delivered after announcing his much-anticipated candidacy for the U.S. presidency two days earlier. The campaign speech was attended by a crowd of 14,500 people, and Kennedy used the opportunity to share anti-war views on the Vietnam War. Evan Thomas wrote in his biography of Kennedy that "the setting was ideal for a raucous campaign kickoff." Kennedy was assassinated less than three months later, on June 6, 1968, after winning the California Democratic primary.

== Gen. William Westmoreland (1969) ==
U.S. General William Westmoreland, a main target for student protests against the Vietnam War, spoke on April 9, 1969. The alternative newspaper in Lawrence, Kansas, wrote afterwards: "The man himself came to speak to the students of Kansas State. Yes, General William Westmoreland decided to deliver his first college lecture since returning from Viet Nam here, and he could not have picked a better place. Kansas State students will be courteous at all times... The General was greeted by applause, by cheering, by approval."

== Richard Nixon (1970) ==
U.S. President Richard Nixon spoke at the Landon Lecture Series on September 16, 1970. As student protestors gathered outside, Nixon delivered what the Christian Science Monitor called "one of the strongest and most uncompromising speeches of his career," denouncing the protests as part of a "cancerous disease" that is gripping the United States. Nixon asserted: "we face the greatest crisis in the history of American education today." The complete speech was aired on network television, and then rebroadcast on several local stations after Nixon supporters purchased time to re-air it.

== Ian Smith (1980) ==
Former Rhodesian Prime Minister Ian Smith was scheduled to deliver a Landon Lecture on October 31, 1980. The speech was disrupted by protestors objecting to the denial of voting rights to blacks in the former Rhodesia (now Zimbabwe) under Smith's governance. Due to the controversy, the speech was recategorized as a non-Landon Lecture and is not included in the history of the series.

== Ashleigh Banfield (2003) ==
MSNBC news reporter Ashleigh Banfield delivered a Landon Lecture on April 24, 2003. Banfield used the forum to raise concerns regarding media coverage of the Iraq War. She spoke against "cable news operators who wrap themselves in the American flag and go after a certain target demographic" and specifically named Fox News Channel as an example. The New York Times reported that her speech angered NBC management, who rebuked her and lowered her profile.

== George W. Bush (2006) ==
On January 23, 2006, U.S. President George W. Bush spoke at the Landon Lecture, one month after news reports broke the story of the U.S. government's warrantless wiretapping of telephone conversations in the United States. In his Landon Lecture, Bush gave the domestic wiretapping program the name of "Terrorist Surveillance Program" for the first time. Before Bush's speech, NPR aired a piece comparing Bush's Landon Lecture speech to Nixon's appearance in the series in 1970, noting both were defending their national security policies "as public discontent with a foreign war persists."

== Landon Lecture speakers ==
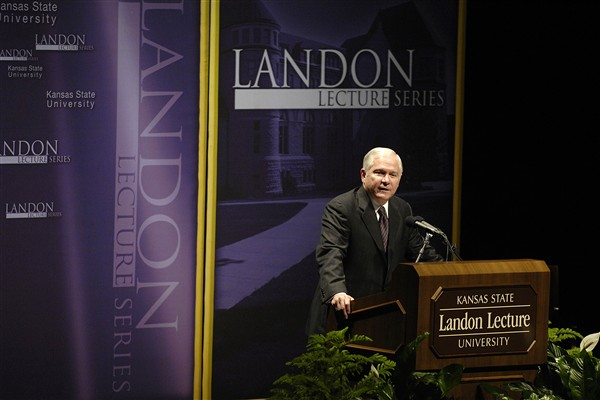
Defense Secretary Robert Gates delivering a Landon Lecture in November 2007

Through February 2024 there have been 184 Landon Lectures, featuring 187 speakers. The most recent speaker was Laura Kelly, Governor of Kansas, who spoke on February 16, 2024. Unless otherwise noted, the speaker held the office indicated below at the time the Landon Lecture was delivered:

=== U.S. presidents ===
- Richard Nixon (1970)
- Gerald Ford (1978) (not in office)
- Ronald Reagan (1982)
- Jimmy Carter (1991) (not in office)
- George W. Bush (2006)
- Bill Clinton (2007) (not in office)

=== U.S. vice presidents ===
- Hubert Humphrey (1970) (not in office)
- Walter Mondale (1979)
- George H. W. Bush (1985)

=== Cabinet officials ===
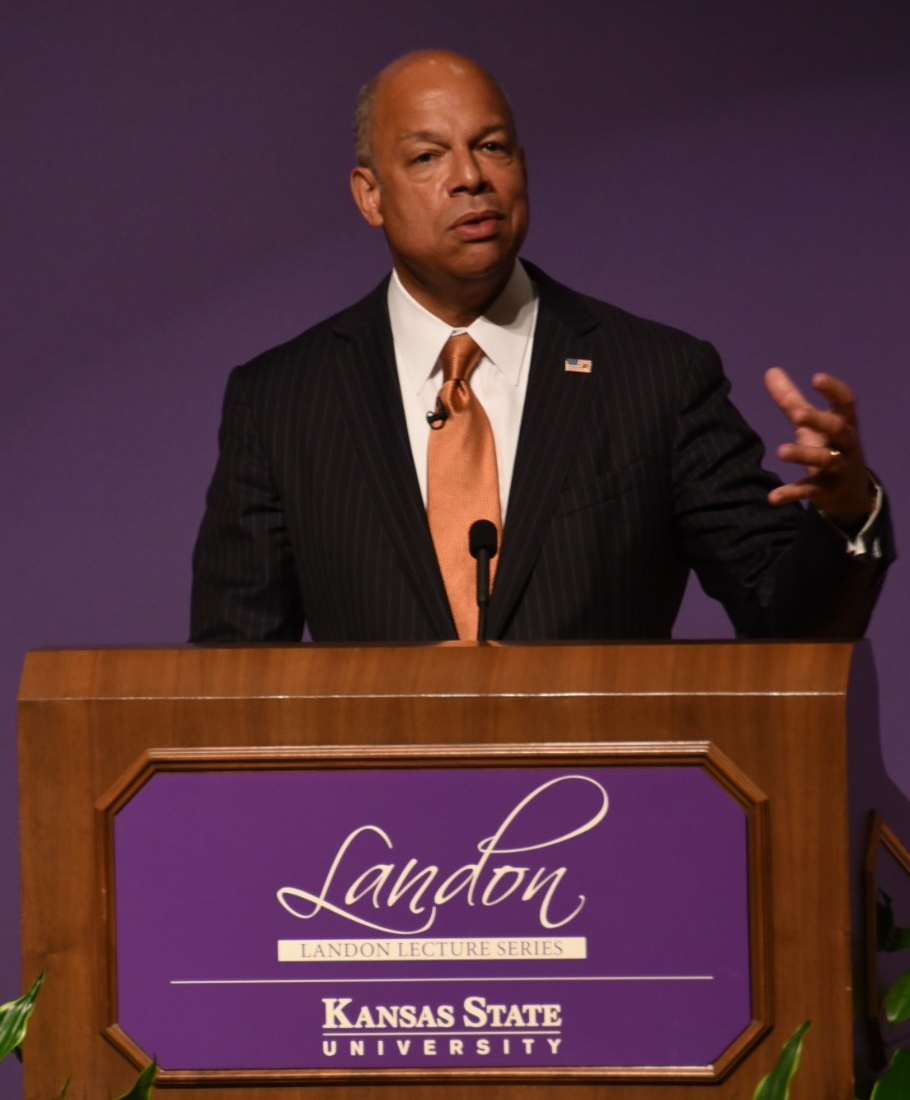
US Homeland Security secretary, Jeh Johnson speaking in 2013

- Wally Hickel, Secretary of Interior (1970)
- Earl Butz, Secretary of Agriculture (1972)
- William Ruckelshaus, first EPA Administrator (1972)
- Elliot Richardson, Secretary of Health, Education and Welfare (1972)
- Anne Armstrong, Counselor to the President (1974)
- William E. Simon, Secretary of Treasury (1975)
- Robert Bergland, Secretary of Agriculture (1977)
- John Connally former Secretary of Treasury (1980) (not in office)
- Edmund Muskie, Secretary of State (1980)
- James R. Schlesinger, former Secretary of Defense (1980) (not in office)
- John Rusling Block, Secretary of Agriculture (1981, 2013)
- Caspar Weinberger, Secretary of Defense (1984)
- William Bennett, Secretary of Education (1986)
- George P. Shultz, Secretary of State (1986)
- Clayton Keith Yeutter, Secretary of Agriculture (1989)
- Elizabeth Dole, Secretary of Labor (1990)
- Lamar Alexander, Secretary of Education (1992)
- Mike Espy, Secretary of Agriculture (1994, 2013)
- William Perry, Secretary of Defense (1995)
- Dan Glickman, Secretary of Agriculture (1995, 2013)
- Janet Reno, Attorney General (1995)
- Henry Kissinger, former Secretary of State, Nobel laureate (1996) (not in office)
- William S. Cohen, Secretary of Defense (1997)
- Donna Shalala, Secretary of Health (2000)
- Gale Norton, Secretary of Interior (2002)
- Donald Rumsfeld, Secretary of Defense (2006)
- Robert Gates, Secretary of Defense (2007)
- Kathleen Sebelius, Secretary of Health (2010)
- Tom Vilsack, Secretary of Agriculture (2012)
- Mike Johanns, former Secretary of Agriculture (2013) (panel of 6 former Secretaries of Agriculture)
- Ann Veneman, former Secretary of Agriculture (2013) (panel of 6 former Secretaries of Agriculture)
- Ed Schafer, former Secretary of Agriculture (2013) (panel of 6 former Secretaries of Agriculture)
- Jeh Johnson, Secretary of Homeland Security (2015)
- Sonny Perdue, Secretary of Agriculture (2018)
- Mike Pompeo, Secretary of State (2019)

=== Congress members ===
- Rep. Patricia Schroeder (1984)
- Speaker Tip O'Neill (1985)
- Speaker Jim Wright (1988)
- Rep. Henry Hyde (1999)
- Rep. J.C. Watts (2002)

=== U.S. diplomats ===
- Ambassador Daniel Patrick Moynihan (1975)
- Ambassador Shirley Temple (1979)
- Vernon A. Walters, U.N. Ambassador (1988)

=== Finance and business figures ===
- Paul Volcker, Federal Reserve Chairman (1981)
- John Hofmeister, corporate officer (2006)
- Sheila Bair, FDIC Chairman (2009)
- Mehmood Khan, corporate officer (2016)
- Alan Murray, CEO of Fortune (2019)

=== Governors ===
- Alf Landon (1966) (not in office)
- George W. Romney (1967)
- Ronald Reagan (1967)
- Nelson Rockefeller (1968)
- Douglas Wilder (1991)
- Laura Kelly (2024)

=== Health and science figures ===
- Dr. Norman Borlaug, Nobel laureate (1979)
- Richard Truly, NASA Administrator (1990)
- Dr. Harold Varmus, NIH Director, Nobel laureate (1996)
- Dr. David Satcher, U.S. Surgeon General (2001)
- Dr. Temple Grandin, author, spokesperson, professor (2016)

=== Historians, economists and political theorists ===
- Arthur M. Schlesinger, Jr., Pulitzer Prize-winning historian (1968)
- John Kenneth Galbraith, economist (1971)
- William F. Buckley (1973)
- Walter Heller, economist (1974)
- Milton Friedman, Nobel Prize-winning economist (1978)
- Franco Modigliani, Nobel Prize-winning economist (1987)
- Barbara Tuchman, Pulitzer Prize-winning historian (1988)
- Doris Kearns Goodwin, Pulitzer Prize-winning historian (1997)
- David Gergen (2001)
- Stephen Ambrose, historian (2001)
- David McCullough, Pulitzer Prize-winning historian (2002)
- Michael Beschloss, historian (2003)
- H. W. Brands, historian (2016)

=== Media figures ===
- Ralph McGill, Pulitzer Prize winner (1967)
- Dan Rather (1972)
- Carl T. Rowan (1975)
- David Broder, Pulitzer Prize winner (1977)
- Charles Collingwood (1978)
- Malcolm Forbes (1978)
- Hugh Sidey (1980)
- Charles Kuralt (1982)
- Lesley Stahl (1984)
- Hodding Carter III (1984)
- Tom Brokaw (1986)
- George Will, Pulitzer Prize winner (1987)
- Bernard Shaw (1992)
- William Raspberry, Pulitzer Prize winner (1995)
- Sam Donaldson (1997)
- Cokie Roberts (1999)
- Bob Woodward (2000)
- Ashleigh Banfield (2003)
- Paul Harvey (2003)
- Arthur Ochs Sulzberger Jr. (2004)
- Bill Schneider (2004)
- Jim Lehrer (2005)
- Brian Williams (2005)
- John Skipper (2014)
- Steve Forbes (2015)
- John Avlon (2016)
- Margaret Hoover (2016)
- Martin Baron (2017)

=== Military and intelligence ===
- Gen. William Westmoreland (1969)
- Gen. Alexander Haig (1973)
- Gen. Colin Powell (1989)
- Gen. Richard B. Myers (2000)
- Robert Mueller, FBI Director (2004)
- Lee Hamilton (2005)
- Gen. Michael Hayden, CIA Director (2008)
- Gen. David Petraeus (2009)
- Dennis C. Blair, National Intelligence Director (2010)
- Adm. Michael Mullen (2010)
- Gen. Martin Dempsey (2012)
- Thomas Donilon, former National Security Adviser (2014)
- Lt. Gen. Robert Calsen Jr., Superintendent of the U.S. Military Academy at West Point (2016) (Higher Education Panel of Kansas State University Alumni)
- Navy Adm. Cecil Haney, Outgoing commander of the U.S. Strategic Command (2016)

=== Religious figures ===
- Reverend Dr. Martin Luther King Jr. (January 19, 1968)
- The Venerable Fulton J. Sheen (1970)
- Rev. Billy Graham (1974)
- Pat Robertson (1993)

=== U.S. senators ===
- Robert F. Kennedy (1968)
- Edward Brooke (1969)
- Mike Mansfield, Majority Leader (1969, 1977)
- Hugh Scott, Minority Leader (1971)
- William Fulbright (1975) (not in office)
- Thomas Eagleton (1976)
- Charles Mathias (1976)
- Henry M. Jackson (1976)
- Charles H. Percy (1977)
- Howard Baker, Minority Leader (1979, 1999)
- Barry Goldwater (1980)
- Mark Hatfield (1982)
- Ted Kennedy (1984)
- Bob Dole (1985)
- Nancy Landon Kassebaum (1987, 1996)
- David L. Boren (1991)
- Bill Bradley (1991)
- Phil Gramm (1997)
- John McCain (1999)
- Chuck Hagel (2003)
- Pat Roberts (2004)
- Tom Daschle, Minority Leader (2004)
- Sam Brownback (2006)
- Alan K. Simpson (2011) (not in office)
- Jerry Moran (2018)

=== U.S. Supreme Court justices ===
- Chief Justice Earl Warren (1970) (Ret.)
- Justice Sandra Day O'Connor (1988)
- Justice Sonia Sotomayor (2011)

=== Foreign politicians and diplomats ===
- Harold Wilson, former British Prime Minister (1981)
- Sheikh Ahmed Zaki Yamani (1983)
- José Napoleón Duarte, President of El Salvador (1984)
- Óscar Arias, President of Costa Rica (1987)
- Abba Eban, former Israeli Foreign Affairs Minister (1990)
- Violeta Chamorro, President of Nicaragua (1992)
- Gen. Wojciech Jaruzelski, former President of Poland (1996)
- Ernesto Zedillo, former President of Mexico (2001)
- Ryozo Kato, Japanese Ambassador to the U.S. (2005)
- Mikhail Gorbachev, former Premier of the USSR (2005)
- Lech Wałęsa, former President of Poland (2006)
- Prince Turki bin Faisal Al Saud, Saudi Ambassador to the U.S. (2007)
- Zhou Wenzhong, Chinese Ambassador to the U.S. (2008)
- Vicente Fox, former President of Mexico (2008)
- Michael Oren, Israeli Ambassador to the U.S. (2013)
- Luis Guillermo Solís, President of Costa Rica (2016)
- Joyce Banda, President of Malawi (2018) (not in office)
- Juan Manuel Santos, President of Colombia, Nobel Laureate (2020) (not in office)

=== Others ===
- Leonard Woodcock, President of UAW (1971)
- Alan Shepard, astronaut (1973)
- George Gallup (1981)
- Tom Bradley, Mayor of Los Angeles (1984)
- Lynne Cheney, National Endowment for the Humanities (1992)
- Rev. Jesse Jackson (1993)
- Ross Perot (1995)
- Marlin Fitzwater, former White House Press Secretary (1996)
- Ted Turner (2005)
- DeLoss Dodds, former University of Texas men's athletic director (2014) (panel on collegiate sports)
- Bob Bowlsby, Big 12 Conference Commissioner (2014) (panel on collegiate sports)
- Kirk Schulz, KSU President (2014) (panel on collegiate sports)
- Wes Bush, CEO of Northrop Grumman (2016)
- David Hall, president of the University of the Virgin Islands (2016) (Higher Education Panel of Kansas State University Alumni)
- Bud Peterson, president of Georgia Institute of Technology (2016) (Higher Education Panel of Kansas State University Alumni)
- David Beasley, Executive Director of the United Nations World Food Programme (2022)
