= Senator Jolley =

Senator Jolley may refer to:

- Clark Jolley (born 1970), Oklahoma State Senate
- John L. Jolley (1840–1926), South Dakota State Senate

== See also ==
- Russell Jolly (born 1955), Mississippi State Senate
