= Bookie Bolin =

American football player (born 1940)

No. 63, 66
- Position: Guard

Personal information
- Born: June 17, 1940 (age 86); Hamilton, Alabama, U.S.
- Listed height: 6 ft 2 in (1.88 m)
- Listed weight: 240 lb (109 kg)

Career information
- High school: Okolona (Okolona, Mississippi)
- College: Ole Miss
- NFL draft: 1962: 5th round, 58th overall pick
- AFL draft: 1962: 14th round, 107th overall pick

Career history
- New York Giants (1962–1967); Minnesota Vikings (1968–1969)

Awards and highlights
- NFL champion (1969); National champion (1960); Second-team All-SEC (1961)

Career NFL statistics
- Games played: 89
- Starts: 49
- Stats at Pro Football Reference

Treva Gene "Bookie" Bolin (born June 17, 1940) is an American former professional football player who a guard in the National Football League (NFL) from 1962 through 1969. He played college football for the Ole Miss Rebels and was a member of their 1960 national championship team.

== Early life ==
Bookie Bolin was born June 17, 1940, in Hamilton, Alabama. He attended Okolona High School in Okolona, Mississippi.

Bolin was called "Bookie" from his youth and later indicated that he had no recollection about the origin of the nickname.

== College career ==
He attended the University of Mississippi where he started at guard for the varsity team during his sophomore and junior seasons. He was part of the 1960 national championship team. He also played in the 1961 Sugar Bowl and 1962 Cotton Bowl games.

== Professional career ==
Bolin was selected in the 5th round of the 1962 NFL draft by the New York Giants as a "future" for the 1963 season, but was ruled ineligible for further competition by the NCAA and signed immediately with the team for the 1962 season. He saw action in 9 games in a reserve role in 1962 before emerging as the starting right guard for the Giants in 1963, playing in the 1963 NFL Championship Game.

Bolin was moved to the left side in 1967, although only starting 3 times of 13 total appearances.

He was released by the Giants on September 3, 1968, as the team was made its final cut down to the 43-man roster limit for the forthcoming season. He was not long unemployed, however, signing a free agent deal with the Minnesota Vikings on September 20. With the start of the season imminent, Bolin was initially assigned to the Vikings' taxi squad.

Bolin was activated to the 43-man roster on November 8, following the loss of starting guard Larry Bowie to emergency brain surgery to deal with a possible blood clot. He saw action in six games for the Vikings as a reserve during the latter part of the 1968.

A return was made with the Vikings for 1969, with Bolin seeing action in 6 games and making one start for the Norsemen.

== Life after football ==
In the off-season, Bolin worked for the Modern Dixie Life Insurance Company, holding the post of regional vice president by 1967.

An avid outdoorsman, Bolin enjoyed hunting and fishing in his spare time.
