= Okolona High School =

- Okolona Chieftains Logo

Location
- 404 Winter Street; Okolona, Chickasaw County, MS 38860; United States
- 34°00′46″N 88°45′12″W

Information
- School type: Public
- Motto: "One team, one goal. All students will be successful."
- School district: Okolona Municipal Separate School District
- Superintendent: Dexter Green
- Principal: Michael Watkins
- Staff: 11.67 (FTE)
- Grades: 9th–12th
- Enrollment: 161 (2023–2024)
- Student to teacher ratio: 13.80
- Colors: Maroon and white
- Mascot: Chieftains
- Rival: Houston, Shannon
- Feeder schools: Okolona Elementary School
- Website: www.okolona.k12.ms.us/apps/pages/index.jsp?uREC_ID=1615720&type=d&pREC_ID=1749372

Okolona High School is a public high school located in Okolona, Mississippi, United States. It serves grades 9–12. It is part of the Okolona Municipal Separate School District. The school nickname is "The Chieftains". They used to boast athletic teams in track, tennis, baseball, softball, but now only boast football and basketball. They have a vocational-technical school, JMG, art classes, and a drama club. Okolona High School also provides students with free after-school tutoring in English, Reading, Science, Math, SATP History, SATP English II, and SATP Algebra I and Algebra 2

== Notable alumni ==
- Bookie Bolin (b. 1940), American football offensive lineman
- Tim Bowens (b. 1973), American football defensive lineman
