= Wallace A. Battle =

African-American educator (1872–1946)

Wallace Aaron Battle (1872–1946) was an educational leader for African Americans in the Southern United States. He grew up on a cotton farm in Alabama with the other 12 children of Augustus and Jeanetta (Redden) Battle, freed slaves. Battle graduated from Berea College in Berea, Kentucky, in 1901. He helped found Okolona College in 1902, also known as Okolona Industrial School or Okolona Normal and Industrial School. The diary he kept provides a source for his life's work.

== Early life and education ==
Battle was educated at Talladega College in Talladega, Alabama, in 1889–1898 and graduated from Berea College with a master's degree in 1909. He received an honorary doctorate from Berea College in 1933.

== Career ==
Battle resigned from the presidency of Okolona in 1927 to become field secretary of the American Church Institute of the Episcopal Church. In this position, among other duties, he assisted in supervising nine schools and colleges fostered by the Episcopal Church in eight southern states.

== Personal life ==
Battle married Effie Dean Threat on September 9, 1903, and had four children, one of them the psychoanalyst Marie Battle Singer.
