= Bob Anderson (Mississippi politician) =

American politician (1930–1998)

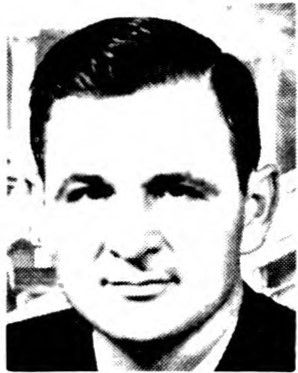
- 1965

Member of the Mississippi State Senate from the 33rd district 31st (1960–1964)
- In office January 1960 – January 1968 Serving with R. E. Gilder 1960–1964
- Preceded by: George W. Owens; Wilton V. Byars

Personal details
- Born: December 20, 1930 Okolona, Mississippi, U.S.
- Died: January 27, 1998 (aged 67) Okolona, Mississippi, U.S.
- Children: 5

Robert Darrow Anderson (December 20, 1930 – January 27, 1998) was an American cattleman and Democratic politician. He served in the Mississippi State Senate from 1960 to 1968.

== Biography ==
Robert Darrow Anderson was born on December 20, 1930, in Okolona, Mississippi. He was the son of Charles W. Anderson. Anderson served in the United States Air Force during the Korean War, and later became involved in the V.F.W. and American Legion. He was a livestock farmer (cattleman) who lived in Buena Vista, Mississippi. Related to his farm work, Anderson was a onetime president of the Mississippi Cattlemen's Association. He was also a member of the board of Mississippi's Gelbvieh Association, and on the Board of American Brahman Breeders Association in Houston, Texas. Until 1973, Anderson was a member of the Board of Directors of the First Citizen's National Bank in Tupelo, Mississippi. He was also a member of Mississippi's Department of Wildlife, Fisheries, and Parks Commission. Anderson died of cancer at his home in Okolona, Mississippi, on January 27, 1998.

== Political career ==
In 1959, Anderson was elected to represent the 31st district (comprising Chickasaw, Calhoun, and Pontotoc Counties) as a Democrat in the Mississippi State Senate for the term spanning from 1960 to 1964. During this term, Anderson was the Vice Chairman of the Levees & Drainage committee and the Public Property committee. He was also a member of the following other committees: Agriculture; County Affairs; Fees & Salaries; Highways; Pensions; Transportation; Universities & Colleges; and Water & Irrigation.

In 1963, Anderson was re-elected to the Senate, this time representing the newly drawn 33rd District (Chickasaw and Clay Counties), for the 1964–1968 term. During this term, Anderson was the Chairman of the Highways Committee and Vice Chairman of the Interstate & Federal Cooperation Committee. He also served on the following committees: Agriculture; Appropriations; County Affairs; Fees & Salaries; Insurance; Public Utilities; and Rules.

== Personal life ==
Anderson was an Episcopalian. He was married to Mary Jo Magers, and they had two sons and three daughters, and 10 grandchildren at the time of Robert's death.
