= Russell Jolly =

American politician

Member of the Mississippi State Senate from the 8th district
- In office January 3, 2011 – January 7, 2020
- Preceded by: Jack Gordon
- Succeeded by: Benjamin Suber

Personal details
- Born: August 16, 1955 (age 70) Okolona, Mississippi
- Party: Democratic

Russell Jolly (born August 16, 1955) is an American politician who served in the Mississippi State Senate from the 8th district from 2011 to 2020.
