= Burns Singer =

Burns Singer (29 August 1928 – 8 September 1964) was born James Hyman Singer in New York City. He was a Scottish poet and translator.

== Early life and education ==
Though he was born in New York, from the age of four, Singer was brought up in Scotland and educated in Glasgow. At the age of 15 he already had well-developed and original literary interests.

Singer's father was a Manchester-born second-generation Jewish immigrant from Poland, his mother was of Irish, Scottish and Norwegian background. Singer would go on to adopt her maiden name, Burns. Singer showed considerable interest in Polish poetry. His collaborative translations of Polish poets included Ignacy Krasicki, Juliusz Słowacki, Cyprian Norwid and Jerzy Peterkiewicz. Some of these appeared in the anthology Five Centuries of Polish Poetry, 1450–1950 (1962), with Peterkiewicz, and a later edition.

== Career and marriage ==
While in Scotland Singer studied English composition for two terms at the University of Glasgow and then zoology. In 1945, at age 17, between two periods at Glasgow university, Singer went to Cornwall where he came into contact with W. S. Graham, a major poetic influence. Singer then had a period of several years when he travelled and worked in Europe. After the 1951 suicide of his mother he returned to Scotland where he worked for four years the marine biology lab in Aberdeen, supporting his father. He had by then spent a year in Marburg and done some service in the United States Army. In 1955, he married Marie Battle, an African-American psychologist; they moved to London, where he sought freelance work writing. He enjoyed a period of success in literary journalism and as a poet. Still and All (1957) was the only collection of his poetry published during his lifetime and was the Poetry Book Society Recommendation for that year. In 1960 he published with Jerzy Peterkiewicz Five Centuries of Polish Poetry, a selection of translations. It is considered that his style was a "middle way" or compromise, between the New Apocalyptics and The Movement, or the Scottish Renaissance and the Sassenach.

== Death ==
He spent some time with Marie in Cambridge, before ultimately returning to marine biology. His early death, in Plymouth, was from a heart attack. His ashes were scattered at sea. There is a memorial to Singer in the churchyard of St Mary the Less (Little St Mary's) in Cambridge.

== Works ==
- Living Silver (1953) - a study of the British fishing industry
- Still and All (1957) (poems)
- Five Centuries of Polish Poetry (1962) with Jerzy Peterkiewicz
- Collected Poems (1970) - posthumously, edited by W. A. S. Keir
- Selected Poems (1977) - posthumously, edited by Anne Clusenaar
- Collected Poems (2001) - posthumously, edited by James Keery

== Sources ==
- poetry magazine article on Singer
- Burns Singer 1928 - 1964. Scottish Poetry Library.
