= Benjamin Suber =

American politician

Member of the Mississippi Senate from the 8th district
- Incumbent
- Assumed office January 7, 2020
- Preceded by: Russell Jolly

Personal details
- Born: Oxford, Mississippi, U.S.
- Party: Republican
- Children: 5
- Education: Arkansas State University; Mississippi State University; Mississippi College School of Law (JD)
- Occupation: Attorney, business owner

Benjamin Suber is an American attorney and politician who has served in the Mississippi State Senate from the 8th district since 2020.

== Early life and education ==
Suber was born in Oxford, Mississippi but later moved to Arkansas, where he attended Manila High School. He attended both Arkansas State University and Mississippi State University. He got his J.D. degree from Mississippi College School of Law.

== Career ==
After law school, Suber became a practicing attorney. He serves as the town attorney for Pittsboro, Mississippi. He is also a member of the Board of Directors of Calhoun County Farm Bureau and a member of the Advisory Board of Directors for the Calhoun Banking Center. He is a small business owner.

Suber has worked as the Municipal Judge for Bruce, Mississippi. He was named a special judge in a case involving Calhoun County school officials, since both judges from the Calhoun County Court recused themselves.

Upon announcement that Mississippi State Senator Russell Jolly of the 8th district was not filing for re-election, Suber decided to run to fill the seat, among several other candidates. He secured 46.9% of the vote in the Republican primary, 51.7% in the Republican primary runoff, and 57.2% in the general election; he assumed office on January 7, 2020. For the 2021 session, he is the Vice-Chair for the Wildlife, Fisheries and Parks Committee and is a member on the following others: Agriculture; Appropriations; Business and Financial Institutions, Constitution; Enrolled Bills; Judiciary, Division B; and Municipalities.

== Political Positions ==
During his campaign, Suber advocated for expanding vocational education in public schools and increasing mental health care access to those charged and convicted of drug offenses. He also called for affordable health insurance.

In June 2020, he sponsored a bill that would have allowed the municipality of Okolona to provide broadband Internet through existing infrastructure already owned by the city, such as utility poles. The bill died in the Senate, a decision sharply criticized by Okolona Mayor Sherman Carouthers.

== Personal life ==
Suber is a member of the Bruce Rotary Club and the Mississippi Bar Association.

He is married and has five children. He is a Methodist.
