= Elliott-Donaldson House =

Historic house in Mississippi, United States

- U.S. National Register of Historic Places
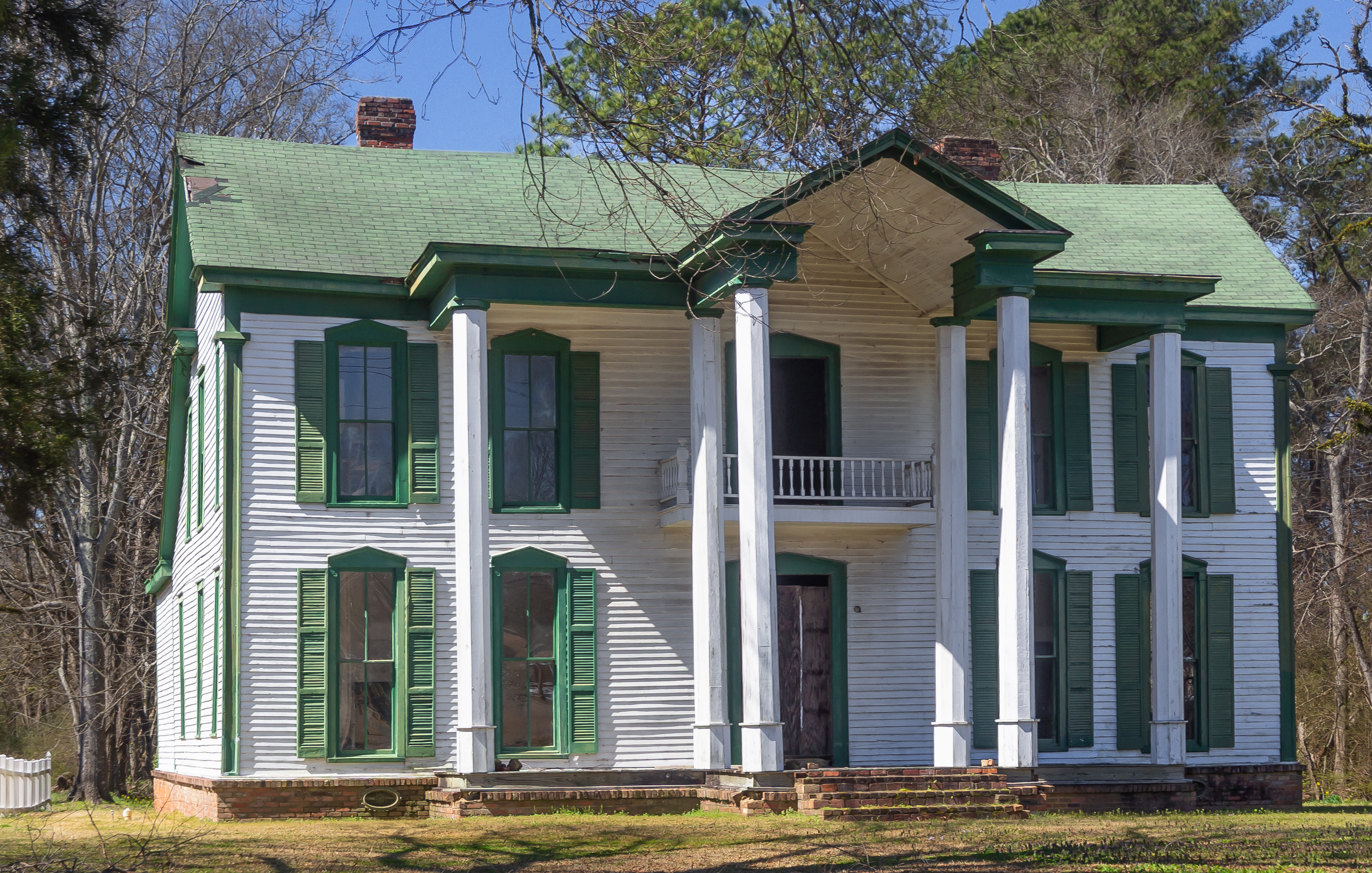

- Location within Mississippi
- Location: 109 N. Church St., Okolona, Mississippi
- Coordinates: 34°0′24″N 88°45′24″W
- Area: 2.3 acres (0.93 ha)
- Built: 1850
- Architectural style: Greek Revival
- NRHP reference No.: 80002203
- Added to NRHP: September 15, 1980

The Elliott-Donaldson House is a historic mansion in Okolona, Mississippi, U.S.. It was built in 1850, a decade prior to the American Civil War of 1861–1865. By the end of the war, in 1865, Confederate States Army General Nathan Bedford Forrest stayed in the house to rest. It has been listed on the National Register of Historic Places since September 15, 1980.
