= Okolona Municipal Separate School District =

School district in Mississippi, United States

Coordinates: 34.004353°N 88.754330°W

Location
- Okolona, Mississippi United States

District information
- Grades: K – 12th
- Superintendent: Paul Dobbs (Interim)

Other information
- Website: www.okolona.k12.ms.us

The Okolona Municipal Separate School District is a public school district based in Okolona, Mississippi (USA).

In addition to Okolona, the district serves rural areas in eastern Chickasaw County and extends into a small portion of neighboring Monroe County.

== Schools ==
- Okolona High School (Grades 5–12)
- Okolona Elementary School (Grades K-4)

== Demographics ==
=== 2006–07 school year ===
There were a total of 777 students enrolled in the Okolona Municipal Separate School District during the 2006–2007 school year. The gender makeup of the district was 52% female and 48% male. The racial makeup of the district was 96.01% African American, 3.86% White, and 0.13% Asian. 82.9% of the district's students were eligible to receive free lunch.

=== Previous school years ===
School Year	Enrollment	Gender Makeup		Racial Makeup				
School Year	Enrollment	Female	Male	Asian	African American	Hispanic	Native American	White
2020-2021	521	47%	53%	0.6%	94.6%	0%	–	2.5%
2005–06	820	51%	49%	0.37%	95.12%	0.37%	–	4.15%
2004–05	852	51%	49%	0.47%	94.13%	0.35%	–	5.05%
2003–04	852	51%	49%	0.82%	94.13%	0.35%	–	4.69%
2002–03	839	51%	49%	1.07%	94.87%	0.36%	–	3.69%

== Accountability statistics ==
	2006–07	2005–06	2004–05	2003–04	2002–03
District Accreditation Status	Accredited	Accredited	Accredited	Accredited	Accredited
School Performance Classifications
Level 5 (Superior Performing) Schools	0	0	0	0	0
Level 4 (Exemplary) Schools	0	0	0	0	0
Level 3 (Successful) Schools	2	1	0	1	1
Level 2 (Under Performing) Schools	0	1	2	1	1
Level 1 (Low Performing) Schools	0	0	0	0	0
Not Assigned	0	0	0	0	0

== See also ==
- List of school districts in Mississippi
