= Jack Gordon (Mississippi politician) =

American politician

Carl Jackson "Jack" Gordon Jr. (December 29, 1944 – May 7, 2011) was an American Democratic politician from Mississippi.

Born in Tupelo, Mississippi, Gordon served in the Mississippi House of Representatives 1972–80. He later served in the Mississippi State Senate from 1980 to 1992, and then again from 1996 until his death from brain cancer at his home in Okolona, Mississippi, aged 66.

He was married to the former Martha Ann Estes.
