= William Raspberry =

American journalist (1935–2012)

William James Raspberry
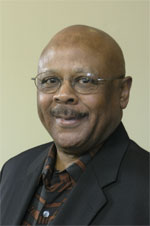
- Born: October 12, 1935; Okolona, Mississippi, U.S.
- Died: July 17, 2012 (aged 76); Washington, D.C., U.S.
- Resting place: Rock Creek Cemetery; Washington, D.C., U.S.
- Education: Indiana Central College, B.S. 1958 (History)
- Occupation: Journalist
- Spouse: Sondra Patricia Raspberry (née Dodson) (m. 1966–2012)
- Children: Patricia D. Raspberry; Mark J. Raspberry; Angela Raspberry Jackson; foster son, Reginald Harrison
- Relatives: James Lee Raspberry, teacher (father); Willie Mae Tucker Raspberry, teacher (b. ~1906) (mother)
- Writing career
- Notable awards: 1965 Capital Press Club’s Journalist of the Year award; 1994 Pulitzer Prize for Commentary; 1994 National Association of Black Journalists lifetime achievement award; 2004 National Press Club's Fourth Estate Award; 15+ honorary doctorates

William James Raspberry (October 12, 1935 – July 17, 2012) was an American syndicated public affairs columnist. He was also the Knight Professor of the Practice of Communications and Journalism at the Sanford Institute of Public Policy at Duke University. An African American, he frequently wrote on racial issues.

In 1999, Raspberry received the Elijah Parish Lovejoy Award as well as an honorary Doctor of Laws degree from Colby College.

== Career ==
After earning a B.S. in history at the University of Indianapolis in 1958, Raspberry continued to work at the local weekly Indianapolis Recorder where he had begun in 1956, rising to associate managing editor. He was drafted and served as a U.S. Army public information officer from 1960 to 1962. The Washington Post hired him as a teletypist in 1962. Raspberry quickly rose in the ranks of the paper, becoming a columnist in 1966. Raspberry was a finalist for the Pulitzer Prize in 1982, and won the Pulitzer Prize for Commentary in 1994.

Raspberry supported gay rights, writing at least one column condemning gay-bashing. He argued against certain torts and complaints from the disabled. Ragged Edge, a disabled-rights publication, published complaints from letters to the editor that the Post did not print.

Raspberry retired in December 2005. He provided the Washington Post a guest column on November 11, 2008, commenting on the election of Barack Obama as president of the United States.

As of 2008, he was president of "Baby Steps", a parent training and empowerment program based in Okolona, Mississippi. Raspberry was an alumnus of Okolona College.

He was the author of Looking Backward at Us, a collection of his columns from the 1980s.

== Death ==
Raspberry died of prostate cancer in Washington, D.C. on July 17, 2012, aged 76. He was buried at Rock Creek Cemetery.
