= Robert F. Kennedy's remarks at the University of Kansas =

1968 speech by U.S. Senator Robert F. Kennedy

Robert F. Kennedy's remarks at the University of Kansas were given on March 18, 1968. He spoke about student protests, the Vietnam War, and the gross national product. At the time, Kennedy's words on the latter subject went relatively unnoticed, but they have since become famous.

== Background ==
Kennedy had given his first campaign speech earlier that morning at Kansas State University before flying into Lawrence Municipal Airport to give his speech at the University of Kansas. Classes were cancelled in advance of Kennedy's appearance.

== The speech ==
The speech was delivered at 1:30 PM in Phog Allen Fieldhouse before 20,000 people. The arena itself was over capacity; the school had only 16,000 enrolled students, and many sat on the basketball court, leaving only a minimal amount of open space around the lectern in the center.

Shortly before the speech, Kennedy warned the student union, "Some of you may not like what you're going to hear in a few minutes, but it's what I believe; and if I'm elected president, it's what I'm going to do..."

=== Summary ===
Most of Kennedy's speech was given extemporaneously, with phrases from older speeches linking together sections from his remarks at KSU. He began on the subject of the Vietnam War, calling for an end to the bombing campaign and negotiations with the Viet Cong.

On the matter of student protests, he quoted William Allen White (a university alum), as he had in his earlier speech:

"If our colleges and universities do not breed men who riot, who rebel, who attack life with all the youthful vision and vigor, then there is something wrong with our colleges. The more riots that come out of our college campuses the better the world for tomorrow."

These words surprised many members of the audience.

He continued onto the matter of poverty, expressing his own feeling of horror at the conditions poor Americans faced:

I have seen children in Mississippi starving, their bodies so crippled from hunger and their minds have been so destroyed for their whole life that they will have no future. I have seen children in Mississippi – here in the United States – with a gross national product of $800 billion dollars – I have seen children in the Delta area of Mississippi with distended stomachs, whose faces are covered with sores from starvation, and we haven't developed a policy so we can get enough food so that they can live, so that their children, so that their lives are not destroyed, I don't think that's acceptable in the United States of America and I think we need a change. I have seen Indians living on their bare and meager reservations, with no jobs, with an unemployment rate of 80 percent, and with so little hope for the future, so little hope for the future that for young people, for young men and women in their teens, the greatest cause of death amongst them is suicide.

He continued, borrowing imagery from Michael Harrington's book, The Other America:

I run for the presidency because I have seen proud men in the hills of Appalachia, who wish only to work in dignity, but they cannot, for the mines are closed and their jobs are gone and no one – neither industry, nor labor, nor government – has cared enough to help. I think we here in this country, with the unselfish spirit that exists in the United States of America, I think we can do better here also. I have seen the people of the black ghetto, listening to ever greater promises of equality and of justice, as they sit in the same decaying schools and huddled in the same filthy rooms – without heat – warding off the cold and warding off the rats.

Kennedy notably outlined why he thought the gross national product was an insufficient measure of success. (Note: Kennedy's remarks on the gross national product bear much resemblance to comments he made during a speech he gave on May 5, 1967 in Detroit at the Jefferson–Jackson Dinner.) He emphasized the negative values it accounted for and the positive ones it ignored:

Even if we act to erase material poverty, there is another greater task, it is to confront the poverty of satisfaction - purpose and dignity - that afflicts us all.

Too much and for too long, we seemed to have surrendered personal excellence and community values in the mere accumulation of material things. Our Gross National Product, now, is over $800 billion dollars a year, but that Gross National Product - if we judge the United States of America by that - that Gross National Product counts air pollution and cigarette advertising, and ambulances to clear our highways of carnage. It counts special locks for our doors and the jails for the people who break them. It counts the destruction of the redwood and the loss of our natural wonder in chaotic sprawl. It counts napalm and counts nuclear warheads and armored cars for the police to fight the riots in our cities. It counts Whitman's rifle and Speck's knife, and the television programs which glorify violence in order to sell toys to our children.

Yet the gross national product does not allow for the health of our children, the quality of their education or the joy of their play. It does not include the beauty of our poetry or the strength of our marriages, the intelligence of our public debate or the integrity of our public officials. It measures neither our wit nor our courage, neither our wisdom nor our learning, neither our compassion nor our devotion to our country, it measures everything in short, except that which makes life worthwhile. And it can tell us everything about America except why we are proud that we are Americans.

If this is true here at home, so it is true elsewhere in world.

Towards the end of his speech, he quoted George Bernard Shaw: (Note: The words came from Shaw's play Back to Methuselah. Robert's late brother, President John F. Kennedy, had used the same quote while addressing the Irish Parliament in 1963.)

"Some people see things as they are and say, 'why?' I dream things that never were and say, 'why not?'"

These words would become a centerpiece of Kennedy's presidential campaign, and he would repeat them on several occasions.

Kennedy was interrupted 38 times during his speech for applause.

== Aftermath ==
It took Kennedy 15 minutes to make it out of the arena to his car. He later departed on a flight for Washington, D.C. Campaign staffer Jim Tolan would later say of the students' reception, "It was the first time I was ever scared with [Kennedy]. Those kids were out of control. He could have gotten hurt they liked him so much."

=== Legacy ===
At the time, Kennedy's criticism of the gross national product did not receive much attention, though it has since become famous, receiving significant coverage in the writings of economic critics. His words are credited as the beginning of the Beyond GDP movement. In an interview in 2008, Barack Obama said that Kennedy's University of Kansas oration was "one of the most beautiful of his speeches."
