= Stanley Tretick =

American photojournalist (1921–1999)

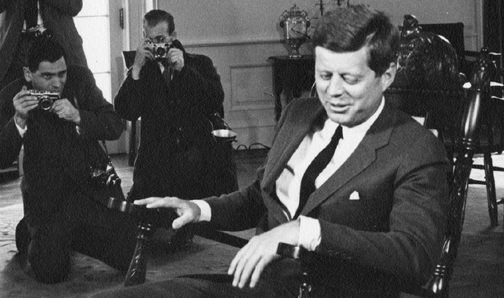
- Stanley Tretick on left in Oval Office 1962
- Born: Aaron Stanley Tretick; July 21, 1921; Baltimore, Maryland, U.S.
- Died: July 23, 1999 (aged 78); Gaithersburg, Maryland, U.S.
- Known for: Photojournalism

Aaron Stanley Tretick (July 21, 1921 – July 23, 1999) was an American photojournalist who worked for UPI, Look, and People magazines. He covered every president from Harry S. Truman through George H. W. Bush. Tretick also did stills for many films, including All the President's Men and The Candidate. He is best known today for the photographs he took of John F. Kennedy’s 1960 campaign and presidency. In the final issue of Look, in 1971, Tretick was called "President Kennedy's photographic Boswell."

== Early life ==
Tretick was born in Baltimore and raised in Washington, D.C., graduating from Central High School in 1940. Following a stint as a copy boy for The Washington Post, he joined the Marines in 1942. Trained as a photographer, he served in the Pacific during World War II and then covered D.C. as a tough-talking news cameraman. Tretick joined Acme Newspictures and photographed combat during the Korean War.

In 1951, Tretick's were among the Korean War photos in the exhibit "Korea—The Impact of War" at the Museum of Modern Art in New York. His photo of a soldier crumpled with despair and holding his muddy face in his hands was selected by Military Times as one of the one hundred most-enduring images captured in combat.

== UPI ==
Tretick moved to United Press, which acquired Acme in 1952. He covered Capitol Hill, the White House and the presidential campaigns of the fifties. In 1952, the television audience saw the intrepid photographer punched by a delegate at the Republican National Convention. A photo of Tretick in 1957 being hit by gangster Johnny Dio outside the Senate Caucus Room appeared around the country. Tretick complained, "The worst part of being hit while on assignment is that some other photographer scoops you with a sensational shot of you getting belted."

The agency, which became United Press International, assigned Tretick to travel with Senator John F. Kennedy in 1960. Tretick logged more miles with Kennedy during the presidential campaign than any other photographer. The photographer and candidate became friends and Tretick took many important pictures during this time.

== Look magazine ==
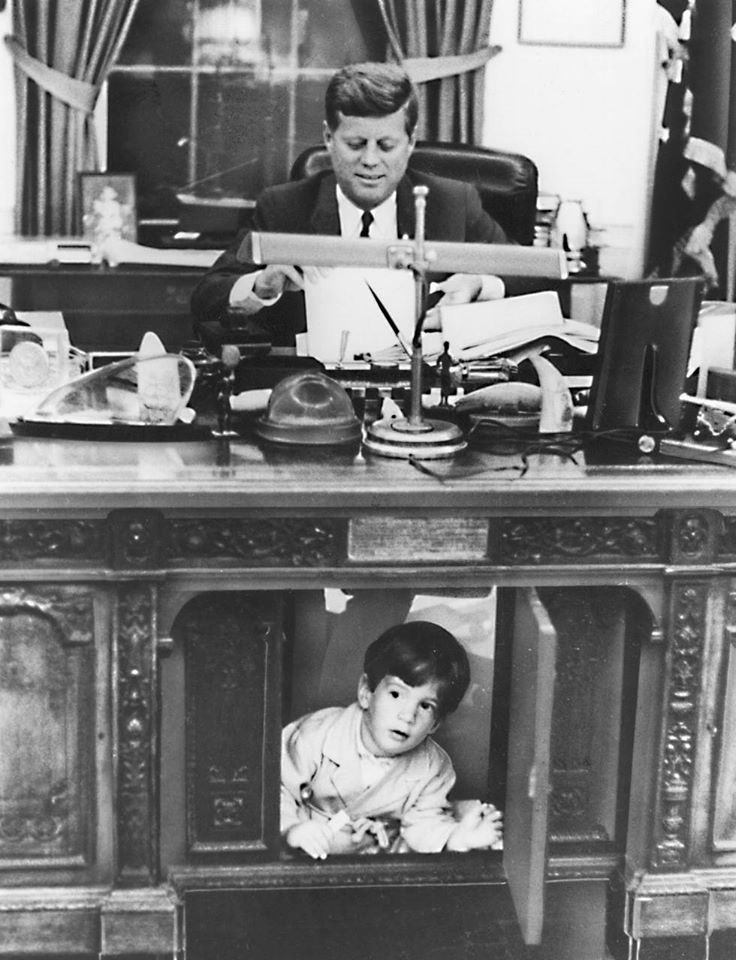
Famous Stanley Tretick photo of John F. Kennedy Jr. inside the Oval Office Resolute desk

In 1961, when Kennedy took office, UPI refused to assign Tretick exclusively to the White House. Kennedy told Tretick to get a job with any publication that would, promising him extensive access. On this basis, Look hired Tretick. Tretick is noted for the photographs he took of President Kennedy with his children.

Though his wife Jacqueline fought to shield young Caroline and John Jr., Kennedy knew the public relations value of images that showed him with his young family. As Laura Bergquist of Look wrote about a battle over Tretick's photos of Caroline, Kennedy "was a reasonable man, open to persuasion, especially in matters of self-interest.". According to Philip Brookman of the Corcoran Gallery of Art,

[Tretick's] photographs of [the Kennedys] published in Look from 1961 to 1964, helped define the American family of the early sixties and lent Kennedy an endearing credibility that greatly contributed to his popularity. A 1962 Look cover of Kennedy driving his nieces and nephews in a golf cart, taken at the family compound in Hyannis Port, is akin to the patriotic, illustrative paintings of Norman Rockwell that still graced the covers of the Saturday Evening Post. Tretick's uncanny understanding of the symbolic value of such imagery allowed him to focus on small humanistic moments within the power and politics of Washington.

On October 2, 1963, Tretick took his most famous photograph for an article about the President and his son. While Jacqueline Kennedy was out of the country, Tretick was allowed to join the father and son, walking the halls of the White House and playing together in the Oval Office. Tretick's photo of the moment John Jr., popped out from under the President's desk, with Kennedy seated behind, encapsulates the myth of Camelot. When Kennedy was assassinated on November 22, 1963, these pictures were already on the newsstands and helped create lasting memories of John F. Kennedy the man.

Tretick also covered Robert F. Kennedy's 1968 presidential campaign. His last picture of Bobby Kennedy was taken as Kennedy was going down to speak to his jubilant supporters after his victory in the California primary. Kennedy was assassinated after making that speech. One of Tretick's photos of Robert F. Kennedy was used for a commemorative stamp released in 1979.

== People magazine ==
In later years, Tretick began to spend more time covering the movie industry. In addition to his news work, Tretick did special still photography for movies, becoming friends with Robert Redford, Warren Beatty, Dustin Hoffman and others. His first major Look cover for a movie was of the "dames" of Valley of the Dolls in 1967. In 1996, Washingtonian magazine said that "his career has been a kind of metaphor for the Washington-Hollywood connection."

When Look magazine folded in 1971, Tretick became a founding photographer of People magazine where he retired in 1995 as a contributing photographer. He covered major stories such as Watergate, Iran-Contra and the Clarence Thomas hearings.

He turned down a chance to be President Jimmy Carter's personal photographer. "I didn't feel he wanted an intimate, personal photographer around him," Tretick said.

== Death ==
Tretick died in July 1999 at the age of 78, just days after John F. Kennedy Jr.'s plane crashed off the coast of Martha's Vineyard.

Tretick had said of his picture of John F. Kennedy Jr. in his father's desk, "When I shove off I'll probably be remembered for the snap of John-John." His obituaries bore this out, invariably mentioning the photo; some newspapers printed it. But Dick Stolley of Time, who had known Tretick at Look and at People, recognized the breadth of Tretick's work: "He was that most unusual of photographers, a man who could do anything—soft subjects like the Kennedy children and very tough things, too."

== Awards ==
- First prize in personalities class, White House News Photographers Association, 1950
- National Headliners Award, 1951
- Second prize and honorable mention in war class, White House News Photographers Association, 1951
- Third prize in presidential class and third prize and honorable mention in personalities class, White House News Photographers Association, 1953
- Second prize in personalities class, honorable mention in presidential class, and third prize in spot news class, White House News Photographers Association, 1954
- Graflex Achievement Award, 1955
- First prize in presidential class and grand award, White House News Photographers Association, 1956
- First prize in color class, honorable mentions in personalities class and presidential class, White House News Photographers Association, 1962
- First prize in color news class, second prize in portfolio class and honorable mention in presidential class, White House News Photographers Association, 1964
- First prize for picture story, first prize in color class, and grand award, White House Photographers Competition, 1966

== Books ==
- A Very Special President (McGraw-Hill, 1965)
- They Could Not Trust the King (Macmillan Publishing, 1974)
- A Portrait of All the President's Men (Warner Books, 1976)
- Capturing Camelot (Thomas Dunne Books, 2012)
- Let Freedom Ring (Thomas Dunne Books, 2013)
- Martin's Dream Day (Atheneum Books for Young Readers, 2017)

== Exhibitions ==
- The Corcoran Gallery of Art, Washington, D. C. (July 1 – October 7, 2002), The Kennedy Years
- The Sixth Floor Museum at Dealey Plaza, Dallas, TX (2003), The Kennedy Years
- 1911 Historic City Hall Arts & Cultural Center, City of Lake Charles, LA (January 28 – April 1, 2006), Bobby, Martin & John: Once Upon an American Dream
- The University of Texas-Pan American, Edinburg, TX (February 2 – April 28, 2006), Surrendering the White House: Exploring Watergate
- Dean Lesher Regional Center for the Arts, Bedford Gallery, Walnut Creek, CA (February 5 – April 16, 2006), The Kennedy Years
- DuSable Museum of African American History, Chicago, IL (January 10 – June 1, 2008), And Freedom For All: The March on Washington for Jobs and Freedom
- Frazier International History Museum, Louisville, KY (May 18 – October 5, 2008), Bobby, Martin & John: Once Upon an American Dream
- Martin Luther King Jr., National Historic Site, Atlanta, GA (November 19, 2008 – February 28, 2009), Bobby, Martin & John: Once Upon an American Dream
- Dale Mabry Campus Art Gallery, Hillsborough Community College, Tampa, FL (January 20 – February 18, 2009), And Freedom For All: The March on Washington for Jobs and Freedom
- The Coventry Cathedral, Coventry, England (January 18 – March 5, 2010), And Freedom For All: The March on Washington for Jobs and Freedom
- The Richard F. Brush Art Gallery, St. Lawrence University, Canton, NY (January 18 – March 25, 2010), And Freedom For All: The March on Washington for Jobs and Freedom
- Southern Vermont Arts Center, Manchester, VT (July 3 – September 12, 2010), Bobby, Martin & John: Once Upon an American Dream
- The Centre Gallery at the University of South Florida, Tampa, FL (January 18–28, 2011), And Freedom For All: The March on Washington for Jobs and Freedom
- Nova Southeastern University, Fort Lauderdale, FL (February 3 – March 31, 2011), And Freedom For All: The March on Washington for Jobs and Freedom
- St. Mark A. M. E. Church, Milwaukee, WI (January 16–20, 2012), And Freedom For All: The March on Washington for Jobs and Freedom
- Griot Museum of Black History, St. Louis MO (March 2012), And Freedom For All: The March on Washington for Jobs and Freedom
- Nathan D. Rosen Museum Gallery at the Levis JCC Sandler Center, Boca Raton, FL (November 11, 2012 – February 15, 2013), From Camelot to Hollywood-Iconic America: A photographic exhibition of Stanley Tretick's Iconic Images
- The Bureau of Land Management, Red Rock Canyon National Conservation Area Visitor Center, Las Vegas, NV (January 18 – February 18, 2013), Let Freedom Ring: Stanley Tretick's Iconic Images of the March on Washington
- Eastern Mennonite University, Harrisonburg, VA (January 7–31, 2013), And Freedom For All: The March on Washington for Jobs and Freedom
- Glen Cove Holocaust Memorial and Tolerance Center, Glen Cove, NY (February 3–28, 2013), And Freedom For All: The March on Washington for Jobs and Freedom
- The William Jefferson Clinton Presidential Library & Museum, Little Rock, AR (August 10 – November 17, 2013), And Freedom For All: The March on Washington for Jobs and Freedom
- Walter J. Manninen Center for the Arts, Endicott College, Beverly, MA (October 1 – December 20, 2013), Capturing Camelot: Stanley Tretick's Iconic Images of the Kennedys
- Temecula Valley Museum, Temecula CA (August 10 – September 29, 2013), And Freedom For All: The March on Washington for Jobs and Freedom
- George Washington University, Gelman Library, Washington, DC (August 15 – September 30, 2013), Let Freedom Ring: The March on Washington for Jobs and Freedom
- New England Museum Association convention, Newport, RI (2013), Capturing Camelot: Stanley Tretick' Iconic Images of the Kennedys
- West Baton Rouge Museum, Port Allen, TX (September 28 – December 29, 2013), Capturing Camelot: Stanley Tretick's Iconic Images of the Kennedys
- Rose Center, Morristown, TN (January – February, 2014), Let Freedom Ring: The March on Washington for Jobs and Freedom
- Visual Arts Center of Northwest Florida, Panama City FL (June 27 – August 22, 2014), Capturing Camelot: Stanley Tretick's Iconic Images of the Kennedys
- Marion County Public Library, Fairmont, WV (January 2 – March 4, 2015), Let Freedom Ring: The March on Washington for Jobs and Freedom
- The Schumacher Gallery, Capital University, Columbus, OH (January 19 – March 25, 2015), Capturing Camelot: Stanley Tretick's Iconic Images of the Kennedys
- Futernick Art Gallery, Dave and Mary Alper Community Center, Miami Beach FL (February 23 – May 3, 2015), Warhol and Wyeth: Behind the Scenes of the Factory Portraits

== Collections ==
Tretick's work is held in the following public collections:

- John F. Kennedy Presidential Library and Museum, Boston, MA.
- Library of Congress, Washington, D.C.
- Ronald Reagan Presidential Library, Simi Valley, CA.

== Movie and theatrical still photography ==
- ...And Justice for All
- 1776 (musical play)
- All the President's Men
- Author! Author!
- Barbarosa
- Brubaker
- Heaven’s Gate
- Hero
- Ishtar
- King of the Gypsies
- Mister Lincoln (play, Ford's Theatre, 1980)
- Mercy or Murder
- Mrs. Soffel
- Nashville Girl
- Reds
- Seven Days in May
- Shoot the Moon
- Teachers
- The Candidate
- The China Syndrome
- The Electric Horseman
- The Exorcist III
- The Legend of the Lone Ranger
- The Man Who Wasn’t There
- The River
- Trading Places
- Urban Cowboy
- Valley of the Dolls
- Witness
- Year of the Dragon
