= Okolona College =

- U.S. National Register of Historic Places
- U.S. Historic district
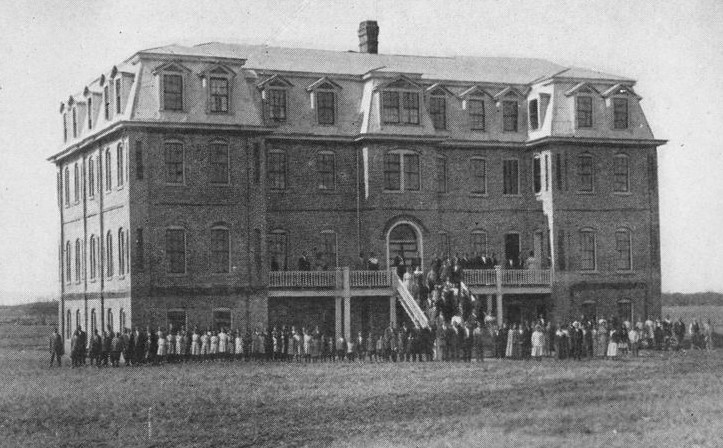
- Okolona School Main Building in 1922

- Location within Mississippi Location within the United States
- Location: US 245 N, 1.1 mi N of jct. with MS 41 and MS 32, Okolona, Mississippi
- Coordinates: 34°1′4″N 88°45′27″W
- Area: 30 acres (12 ha)
- Built: 1929
- Architectural style: Modern Movement
- NRHP reference No.: 02000853
- Added to NRHP: August 9, 2002

Okolona College, was a college for African Americans in Okolona, Mississippi, Chickasaw County, Mississippi. The school is located on Mississippi Highway 245 1.1 miles north of the junction with Mississippi Highway 32 and Mississippi Highway 41. It was also known as Okolona Industrial School, and Okolona Normal and Industrial School.

The site was added to the National Register of Historic Places on August 9, 2002. It is part of The Okolona College Historic District.

== History ==
Built on a Civil War battleground, the school was founded in 1902 by Wallace A. Battle. Influenced by Booker T. Washington, Battle sought to teach practical skills (in agriculture, mechanical arts, and domestic science, as well as teacher training) that would improve the material conditions of Black people living in the South, without directly challenging White supremacy. Battle made accommodationist public statements, saying in 1904 that "the white people of the South have given more money for our uplift than northern white people." The school's board of trustees included members of Okolona's White elite (such as Adam Tonquin Stovall, president of the Mississippi Bar Association and the Columbus and Greenville Railway), local Black merchants such as Charlie W. Gilliam, and Northern activists such as Moorfield Storey. Some of the school's funding came from Northern philanthropists (including Andrew Carnegie) and religious congregations--Battle made regular speaking tours of the North seeking donations. In 1921 the school established a relationship with the American Church Institute for Negroes (ACIN, an affiliate of the Episcopal Church), which provided additional funding. In 1915 the school had 230 students.

Despite Battle's accomodationist approach, the school was the target of racist harassment and violence in the 1920s, culminating in the murder of a teacher (Ulysses S. Baskin, head of the agriculture department) on commencement day in 1925. Battle moved North two years later, taking a job as Field Secretary for the ACIN. Through Storey, Battle made contact with W.E.B. Du Bois, who wrote about the events surrounding Baskin's murder in The Crisis.

Battle's wife Effie T. Battle served as interim principal for several years. In 1933 she was succeeded by Armistead Mitchell Strange, who reorganized the curriculum into a four year high school program and a two year junior college program teaching liberal arts and teacher training. Okolona closed its doors in 1965, when the passage of the Civil Rights Act of 1964 resulted in the shift of African-Americans to public education. Financial difficulties were the immediate cause of the school's closure; when it ceased operations 60% of Okolona's budget came from donations, and most students received financial aid.

== Buildings ==
Four campus buildings survive: Abbott Hall, McDougall Hall, the Vocational Agriculture Building and the T. D. Bratton Memorial Dormitory. A gazebo and the ruins of a dormitory also survive. Brick piers marks the three campus entrances and a neon sign marked the north entrance.

Abbott Hall was built c. 1929–1930 and is a one-story brick and stucco building with seven bays and a side-gabled roof. It contained four classrooms, the school president's office a reception room, and registrar's office.

McDougatt Hall dates to c. 1931 and is a two-story painted brick building. The building's first floor contained a chapel and the chaplain's office as well as space for the business manager and dean. The second floor was used for the nurse's office and health department, science department, economics department and a guest room.

Bratton Memorial Dormitory, also known as Bratton Hall, was built c. 1950s is a brick building with two wings. It was a women's dormitory and housed the school's laundry facilities and cafeteria.

The Vocational Agriculture Building was built c. 1950 and is a one-story brick building with gabled portico over brick columns. It was built on the site of the Robert Patton Library and Old Okolona Hall which burned sometime after 1945.

The dormitory building was constructed c. 1950 and is a one-story brick structure.

== Notable people ==
- William Raspberry, nationally syndicated columnist.

== See also ==
- National Register of Historic Places listings in Mississippi#Chickasaw County
