= Okolona, Mississippi =

- City
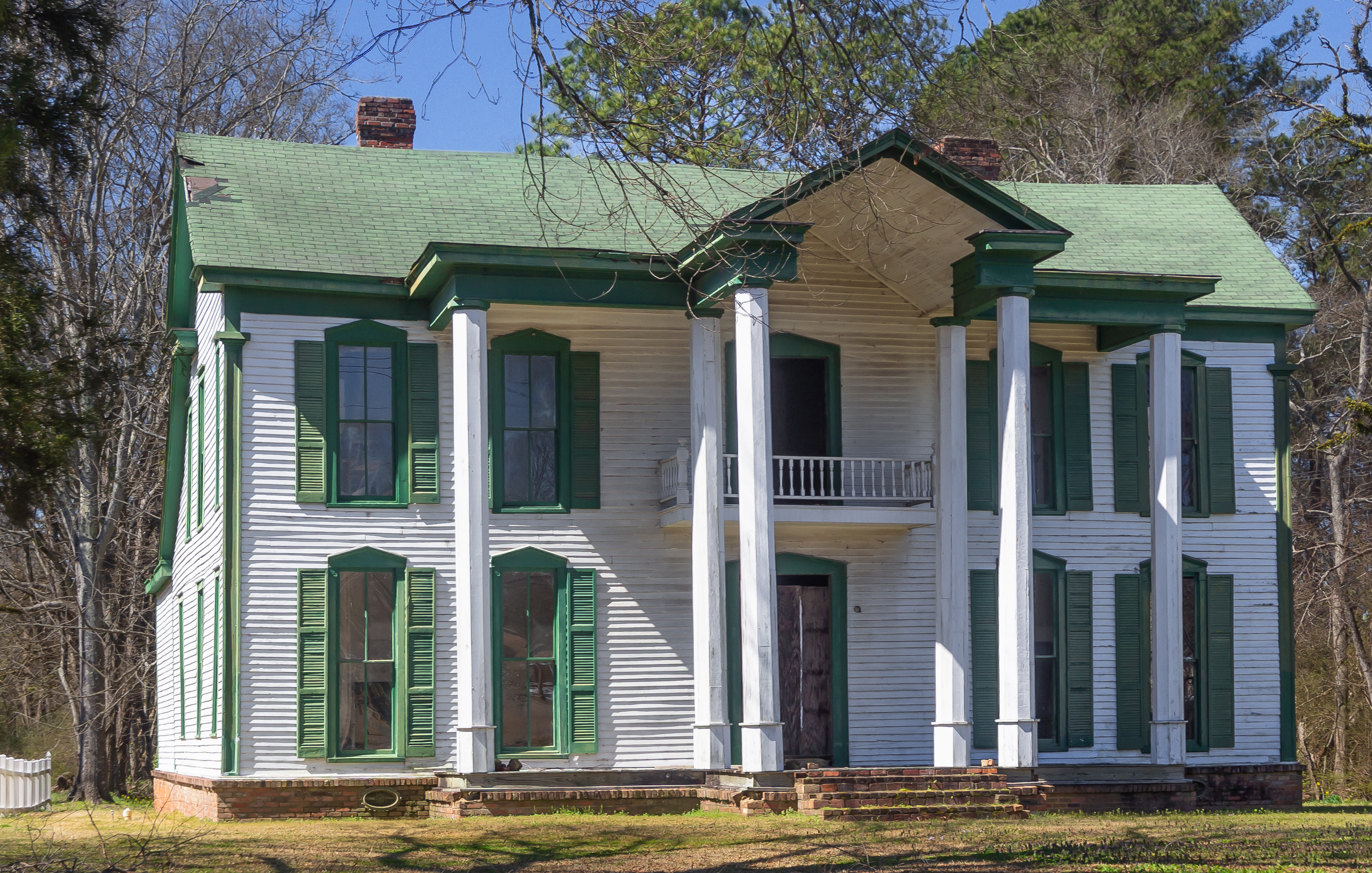
- Elliott-Donaldson House in Okolona

- Flag Seal

- Location of Okolona, Mississippi

- Location in the United States
- Coordinates: 34°0′21″N 88°45′2″W
- Country: United States
- State: Mississippi
- County: Chickasaw

Government
  - Mayor: Eldridge Lowe

Area
  - Total: 7.19 sq mi (18.63 km^{2})
  - Land: 7.18 sq mi (18.59 km^{2})
  - Water: 0.015 sq mi (0.04 km^{2})
- Elevation: 338 ft (103 m)

Population (2020)
  - Total: 2,513
  - Density: 350.1/sq mi (135.18/km^{2})
- Time zone: UTC-6 (Central (CST))
  - Summer (DST): UTC-5 (CDT)
- ZIP code: 38860
- Area code: 662
- FIPS code: 28-53680
- GNIS feature ID: 0694253
- Website: www.cityofokolona.com

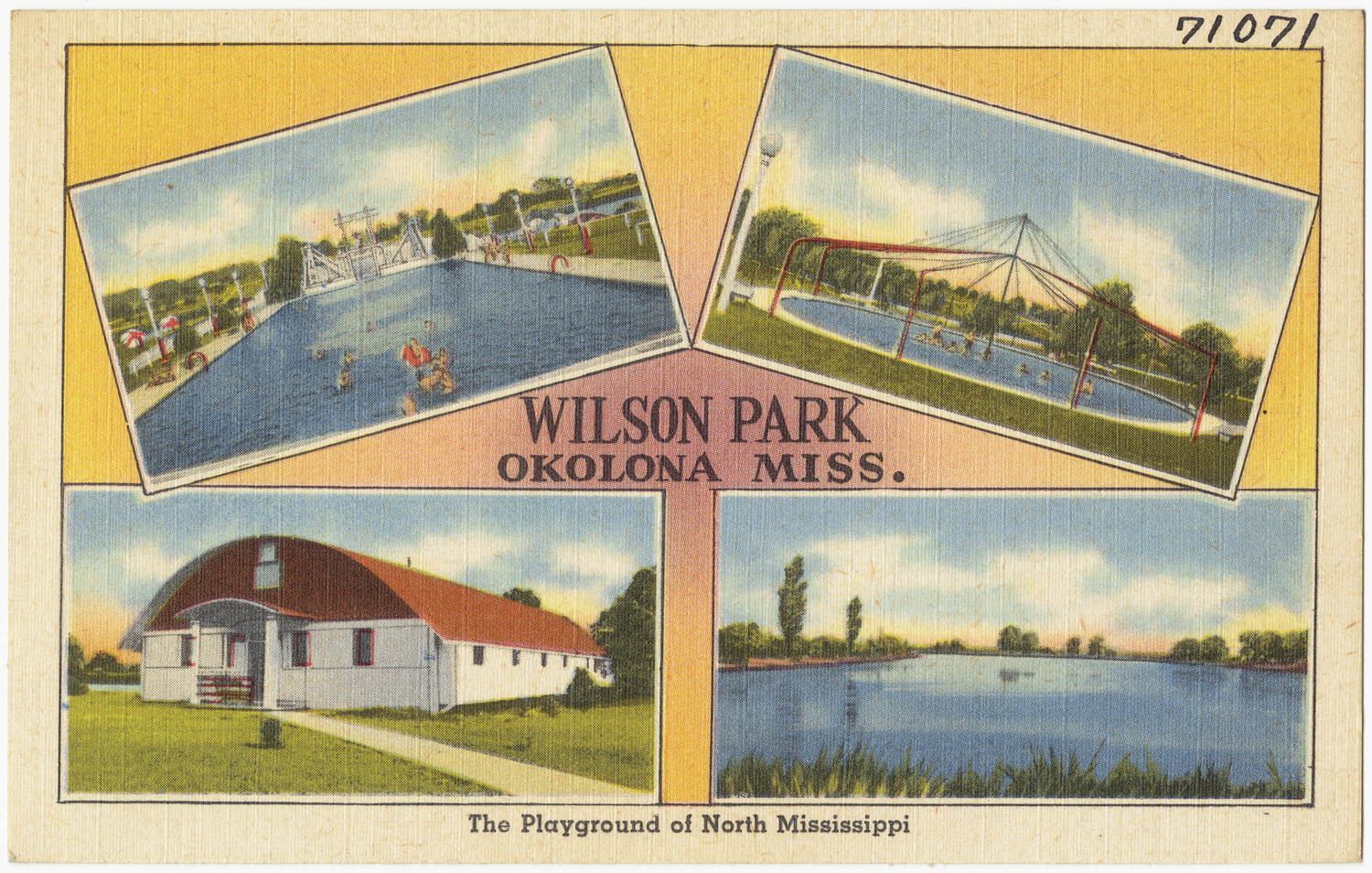
A postcard for Wilson Park in Okolona, c. 1930–1945

Okolona is a city in and one of the two county seats of Chickasaw County, Mississippi, United States. It is located near the eastern border of the county. As of the 2020 census, Okolona had a population of 2,513. It had a large furniture industry and the Wilson Park resort.

== History ==
Okolona was named as Rose Hill in 1845 early in its settlement, but residents later discovered that another location had this name. When a US post office was established here on March 23, 1846, a new name was needed to avoid confusion in mail delivery. According to the Okolona Area Chamber of Commerce, Colonel Josiah N. Walton, postmaster of nearby Aberdeen, Mississippi, remembered an encounter with a Chickasaw warrior years earlier. The man's name was Oka-laua, meaning peaceful, yellow, or blue water. Walton renamed Rose Hill as Okolona in his honor. According to another account, Okalona is a Native American placename, possible from the Choctaw, meaning "people gathered together."

The Mobile and Ohio Railroad completed its tracks though Okolona by July 1860, making the town a center for the ginning of cotton and its shipment to markets. The town grew along Main Street as a result of the railroad. Most commercial buildings from this period, including the depot, were burned during the Civil War.

Due to the destruction brought to the area by the Civil War, few structures from the antebellum period remain. The Elliott-Donaldson House, constructed in 1850, survives and was added to the National Register of Historic Places in 1980. A few other homes have also survived.

In the mid nineteenth century, Okolona and the surrounding Black Prairie, sometimes called the Black Belt or Prairie Belt, became what has been called the "Bread Basket of the Confederacy". The area was part of the original Cotton Belt of Mississippi well before the more famous Delta region gained fame for major cotton production.

=== Civil War era ===
Five skirmishes or battles between Union and Confederate forces occurred in and around Okolona. The eponymous Battle of Okolona occurred in February 1864. In a running cavalry clash between Confederate General Nathan Bedford Forrest and Union General William Sooy Smith, the Federals were defeated just north and west of town. General Forrest's brother, Jeffery, was killed in the engagement.

=== Okolona College ===
Okolona College was a historically black college served African Americans 1902–1965. Today it is central to the Okolona College Historic District.

== Geography ==
According to the United States Census Bureau, the city has a total area of 6.66 square miles (17.26 km^{2}), of which 6.64 square miles (17.21 km^{2}) is land and 0.02 square miles (0.04 km^{2}), or 0.23%, is water.

As highways were built, they passed through the city, connecting it with other towns. This is the location of the junction of former U.S. Route 45 Alternate (Church Street) and Mississippi Highway 32 (Monroe Avenue). US-45A now bypasses the town to the east as a four-lane divided highway.

== Demographics ==
Historical population
Census	Pop.	Note	%±
1870	1,410		—
1880	1,858		31.8%
1890	2,099		13.0%
1900	2,177		3.7%
1910	2,584		18.7%
1920	3,852		49.1%
1930	2,235		−42.0%
1940	2,117		−5.3%
1950	2,167		2.4%
1960	2,622		21.0%
1970	3,002		14.5%
1980	3,409		13.6%
1990	3,267		−4.2%
2000	3,056		−6.5%
2010	2,692		−11.9%
2020	2,513		−6.6%
U.S. Decennial Census

=== Racial and ethnic composition ===
Okolona city, Mississippi – Racial and ethnic composition Note: the US Census treats Hispanic/Latino as an ethnic category. This table excludes Latinos from the racial categories and assigns them to a separate category. Hispanics/Latinos may be of any race.
Race / Ethnicity (NH = Non-Hispanic)	Pop 2000	Pop 2010	Pop 2020	% 2000	% 2010	% 2020
White alone (NH)	1,200	745	490	39.27%	27.67%	19.50%
Black or African American alone (NH)	1,798	1,879	1,922	58.84%	69.80%	76.48%
Native American or Alaska Native alone (NH)	1	1	3	0.03%	0.04%	0.12%
Asian alone (NH)	4	3	3	0.13%	0.11%	0.12%
Native Hawaiian or Pacific Islander alone (NH)	0	0	0	0.00%	0.00%	0.00%
Other race alone (NH)	0	2	5	0.00%	0.07%	0.20%
Mixed race or Multiracial (NH)	21	26	59	0.69%	0.97%	2.35%
Hispanic or Latino (any race)	32	36	31	1.05%	1.34%	1.23%
Total	3,056	2,692	2,513	100.00%	100.00%	100.00%

=== 2020 census ===
As of the 2020 census, Okolona had a population of 2,513. The median age was 39.3 years. 23.3% of residents were under the age of 18 and 19.9% of residents were 65 years of age or older. For every 100 females there were 78.5 males, and for every 100 females age 18 and over there were 72.8 males age 18 and over.

0.0% of residents lived in urban areas, while 100.0% lived in rural areas.

There were 1,022 households in Okolona, of which 31.8% had children under the age of 18 living in them. Of all households, 23.9% were married-couple households, 19.4% were households with a male householder and no spouse or partner present, and 50.4% were households with a female householder and no spouse or partner present. About 34.2% of all households were made up of individuals and 15.2% had someone living alone who was 65 years of age or older.

There were 1,194 housing units, of which 14.4% were vacant. The homeowner vacancy rate was 0.5% and the rental vacancy rate was 16.1%.

=== 2010 census ===
As of the 2010 United States census, there were 2,692 people living in the city. 70.0% were African American, 27.9% White, 0.0% Native American, 0.1% Asian, 0.9% from some other race and 1.1% of two or more races. 1.3% were Hispanic or Latino of any race.

=== 2000 census ===
As of the census of 2000, there were 3,056 people, 1,177 households, and 786 families living in the city. The population density was 481.8 inhabitants per square mile (186.0/km^{2}). There were 1,315 housing units at an average density of 207.3 units per square mile (80.0 units/km^{2}). The racial makeup of the city was 39.40% White, 59.62% African American, 0.03% Native American, 0.13% Asian, 0.13% from other races, and 0.69% from two or more races. 1.05% of the population were Hispanic or Latino of any race.

There were 1,177 households, out of which 33.8% had children under the age of 18 living with them, 35.6% were married couples living together, 28.1% had a female householder with no husband present, and 33.2% were non-families. 30.2% of all households were made up of individuals, and 14.8% had someone living alone who was 65 years of age or older. The average household size was 2.54 and the average family size was 3.16.

In the city, the population was spread out, with 30.0% under the age of 18, 8.9% from 18 to 24, 24.7% from 25 to 44, 22.0% from 45 to 64, and 14.5% who were 65 years of age or older. The median age was 34 years. For every 100 females, there were 77.2 males. For every 100 females age 18 and over, there were 71.6 males.

The median income for a household in the city was $20,000, and the median income for a family was $32,147. Males had a median income of $26,217 versus $17,276 for females. The per capita income for the city was $11,486. 35.4% of the population and 29.7% of families were below the poverty line. Of the total people living in poverty, 55.4% were under the age of 18 and 20.9% were 65 or older.

== Education ==
Okolona is served by the Okolona Municipal Separate School District. On February 19, 2010, the Mississippi State Board of Education voted unanimously to abolish the school district. State Superintendent of Education Tom Burnham said the conservator of the district will be Mike Vinson.

== Notable people ==
- Thomas Abernethy, former US Congressman
- Bob Anderson (Mississippi politician), Mississippi state senator
- Tim Bowens, NFL player for the Miami Dolphins for 10 seasons
- Tom Bowens, former professional basketball player
- Frank Burkitt, former member of the Mississippi House of Representatives and the Mississippi State Senate
- DeVan Dallas, Mississippi state legislator
- Meredith Gardner, linguist and codebreaker
- Jack Gordon, former member of the Mississippi House of Representatives and the Mississippi State Senate
- James Gordon, United States Senator
- Jack Gregory, NFL player; member, Mississippi Sports Hall of Fame
- Russell Jolly, member of the Mississippi State Senate
- William Raspberry, columnist
- Rosa Lee Tucker (1866–1946), Mississippi State Librarian
- Milan Williams, keyboardist and composer for The Commodores
- Delphia Welford, supercentenarian and third-oldest person ever from the United States
