= My Senator and Me =

Book by Edward Kennedy

My Senator and Me: A Dog's-Eye View of Washington, D.C.
- Front cover illustration
- Author: Ted Kennedy
- Illustrator: David Small
- Genre: Children's book
- Publisher: Scholastic Press
- Publication date: May 2006
- Publication place: United States
- Media type: Hardback, Paperback
- Pages: 56
- ISBN: 0-439-65077-1
- OCLC: 61859695
- Dewey Decimal: 328.73092/9 22
- LC Class: JK1025 .K46 2006

My Senator and Me: A Dog's-Eye View of Washington, D.C. is a 2006 children's book by Massachusetts Senator Ted Kennedy. It follows a Portuguese Water Dog named Splash as he tries to help his master, the senator, go about his daily life and pass an education bill. It also explains how a bill becomes a law, the roles of Congress and the Senate and other details of the U.S. system of government, plus biographies of Splash and Kennedy.

In real life, Splash is the name of Kennedy's dog, and the senator is really Kennedy himself. The money earned from the book will be donated to charities, including Read Boston, an organization that supports literacy in Boston public schools. In 2007, the book was made into an animated film directed by Gary McGivney, narrated by David DeVries with additional voices by Ted Kennedy, and produced by Weston Woods.
