= Boiler Room Girls =

American political consultants

The "Boiler Room Girls" was a nickname for a group of six women who worked as political advisors for Robert Kennedy's 1968 presidential campaign in a windowless work area in Kennedy's Washington, D.C. electoral offices. They were political strategists who received national media exposure from the infamous Chappaquiddick incident in 1969. It was in Chappaquiddick that Mary Jo Kopechne died in a car crash, in which Ted Kennedy was the driver.

== Creation of Boiler Room ==
Each "girl" was assigned a regional desk, divided by regions of the country, and was responsible for daily communication in and out of the Washington campaign headquarters to each state director in their region. At the end of the day, a decision book was compiled and sent to Kennedy and his campaign manager, Stephen Smith. Each decision book was composed by the boiler room team. The team of women also kept track of Kennedy's delegate count against Democratic primary contenders Eugene McCarthy and Hubert Humphrey.

Before the 1968 Democratic National Convention, the boiler room team was moved to a temporary office adjoining the convention floor where the same delegate officers met with the same state leaders. Following the assassination of United States Senator Robert F. Kennedy on June 5, 1968, the team was responsible for finishing the campaign coordination work. They eventually dispersed to work in other offices on Capitol Hill or elsewhere in Washington. The Boiler Room Girls were variously described as "frighteningly intelligent, politically astute, capable as all get-out" as well as "uniformly bright, efficient, fascinated by politics".

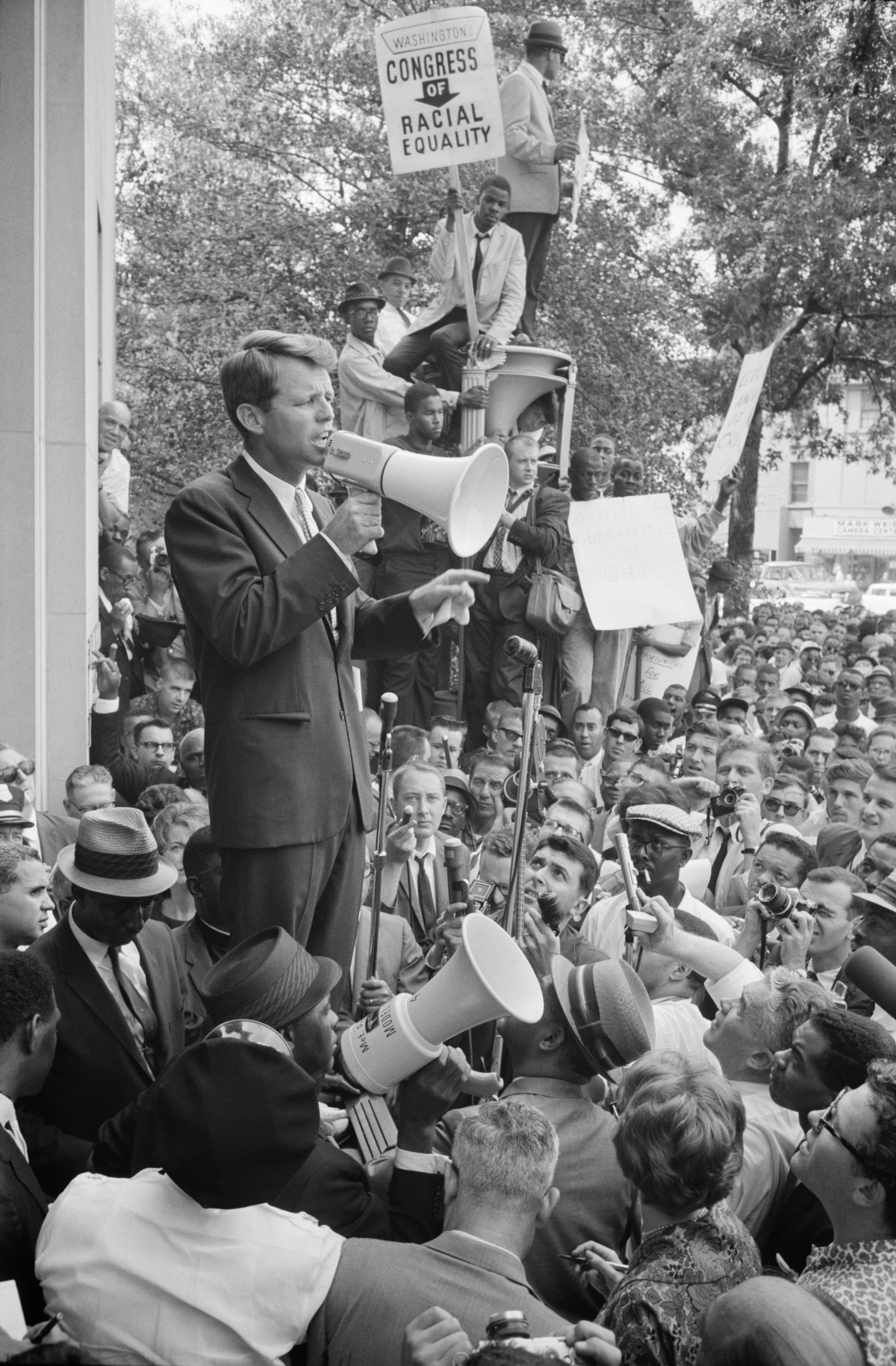
Robert F. Kennedy speaking at a rally in 1963

== "Girls" of the Boiler Room ==
=== Mary Jo Kopechne ===
After graduating in the 1962 class of Caldwell College for Women, Mary Jo Kopechne moved to Alabama where she taught at Montgomery Catholic School. She joined the staff of Senator George A. Smathers of Florida in 1963 as a secretary. One year later she became a speech writer for Joseph Dolan, one of Robert Kennedy's political advisors. After Robert Kennedy's assassination, she joined Matt Reese Associates. She became a member of Senator Edward Kennedy's office. After Chappaquiddick, reports of the incident mis-named Kopechne as “Copachni” by the New Bedford Standard-Times, and “Palporki” by the FBI, and even “TED SAFE; BLONDE DIES” by another wire service.

=== Mary Ellen Lyons ===
Mary Ellen Lyons was a graduate of Regis College in Weston, Massachusetts. Her sister, Nance Lyons, worked on Robert Kennedy's campaign staff as well. She worked for State Senator Beryl Cohen of Massachusetts.

=== Nance Lyons ===
In January 1967, Nance Lyons began "working in case", assisting with constituents, federal agencies, etc. for Robert Kennedy's office. One of her projects was legislation for Massachusetts, and getting the appropriations for the National Seashore or for the Lexington Concord National Park. After Nixon was elected president, she left the government. She received a call from the Senator's office about working for Senator Edward Kennedy. She responded by agreeing to come back under the condition that she receive a legislative assistant job, as she was already doing the work. Legislative assistants wrote the legislation on national issues, as well as the committee work and hearings. In the office, all male legislative assistants had secretaries, who aided them in their work. Nance had to write everything, type it, and mimeograph it by herself. During her time in the government she worked on the economic conversion bill and National Transportation Trust Fund.

=== Esther N. Newberg ===
In 1968, Esther Newberg joined Robert Kennedy's Presidential campaign where she served as an aide. After, she was known to work at the Urban Institute in Washington. She later worked as a literary agent at International Creative Management.

=== Susan Tannenbaum ===
Susan Tannenbaum was from the office of Representative Allard K. Lowenstein, Nassau County Democrat.

=== Rosemary "Crickett" Keough ===
Rosemary Keough was an alumna from Manhattanville College and graduated from Boston University Law School. She had been an administrative assistant to Senator Robert F. Kennedy who also worked for the Children's Foundation in Washington. During the Chappaquiddick incident, Keough's purse was in the backseat of the sunken car, left there from an earlier errand, according to her testimony. She married Paul Redmond, one of the attorneys that Ted Kennedy hired to look after the Boiler Room Girls after the incident and up through the inquest.

== 1969 reunion at Chappaquiddick ==
There had already been one formal reunion of the highly regarded Boiler Room Girls prior to Chappaquiddick. It was held at Hyannis Port two months after the death of Robert Kennedy, was organized by Joseph Gargan plus Joan Kennedy, and was attended by twelve of the young campaign workers. The three day occasion included a cocktail party, a restaurant meal, sailing, swimming, charades and a cookout.

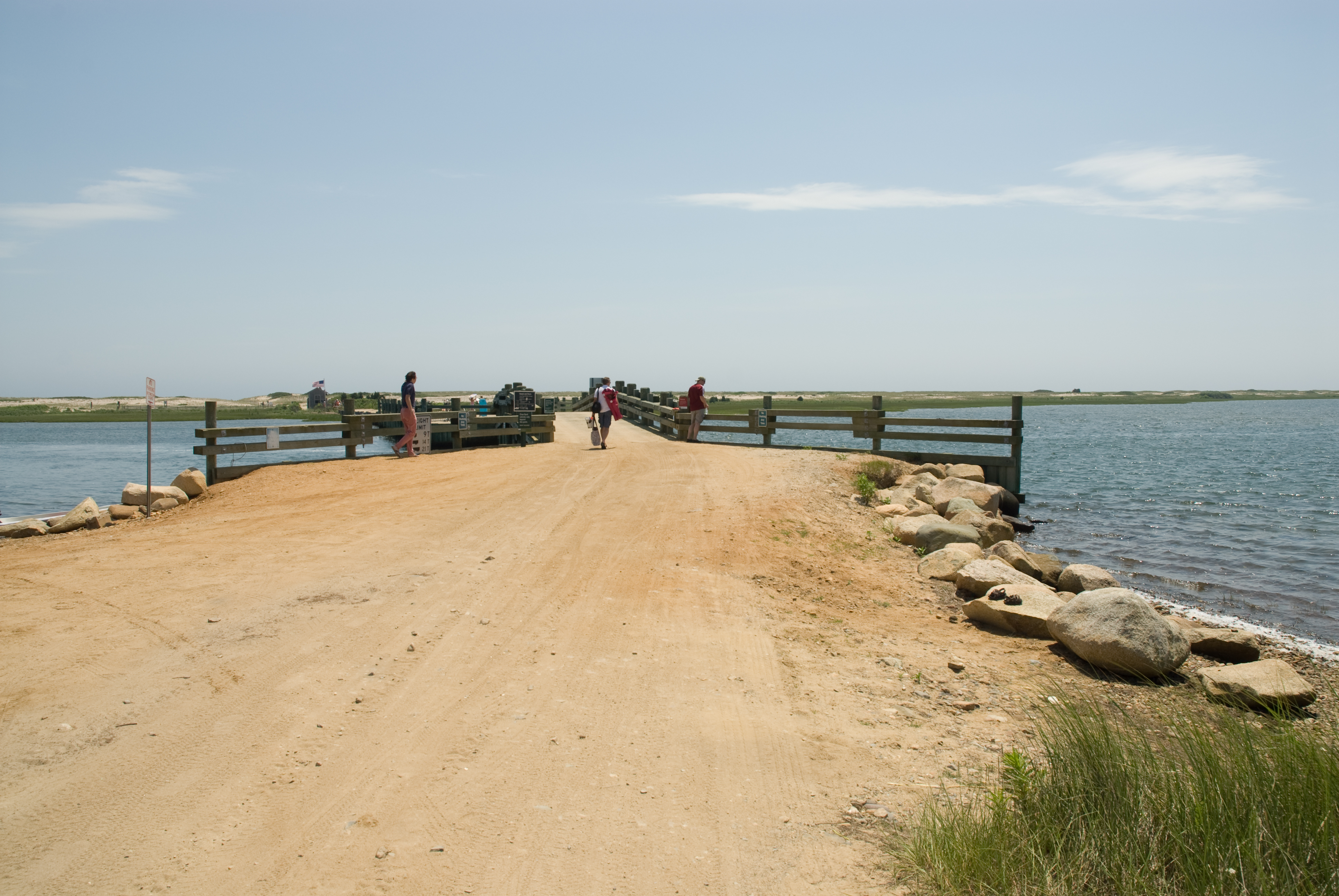
Bridge that Mary Jo Kopechne and Teddy Kennedy drove over in Chappaquiddick Island

On July 18, 1969 the Boiler Room Girls attended a gathering at Chappaquiddick Island with Edward M. Kennedy. He was accompanied by three lawyers, Joseph Gargan, Paul F. Markham, and Charles Tretter, as well as John B. Crimmins, Mr. Kennedy's driver, and family friend, Raymond S. La Rosa. That night, Edward Kennedy and Mary Jo Kopechne went for a drive where they crashed over a bridge into Pocha Pond on Chappaquiddick Island.

== Media Portrayals of Boiler Room ==
In 2017, John Curran directed a movie portrayal of Chappaquiddick, written by Taylor Allen and Andrew Logan. The movie depicts Edward (Ted) Kennedy attempting to persuade Mary Jo Kopechne to join his presidential campaign. In the film, Mary Jo is seen as a political strategist and victim to the car crash. Aside from mentioning Robert (Bobby) Kennedy's campaign, the Boiler Room Girls' other political work is not mentioned. The film only shows the short string of events leading up to the Chappaquiddick incident and the aftermath.
