= Ed Helms =

American actor and comedian (born 1974)

- Helms in 2026
- Born: January 24, 1974 (age 52); Atlanta, Georgia, U.S.
- Education: Oberlin College (BA)
- Occupations: Actor; comedian
- Years active: 1998–present
- Political party: Democratic
- Children: 2

Edward Parker Helms (born January 24, 1974) is an American actor and comedian. From 2002 to 2006, he was a correspondent on Comedy Central's The Daily Show with Jon Stewart. He played paper salesman Andy Bernard in the NBC sitcom The Office (2006–2013), and starred as Stu Price in The Hangover trilogy. He later starred in the comedy series Rutherford Falls (2021–2022), which he co-wrote.

Helms has also starred in dramatic films and comedic films such as Cedar Rapids, Jeff, Who Lives at Home (both 2011), We're the Millers (2013), Vacation (2015), Chappaquiddick (2017), A Futile and Stupid Gesture, Tag (both 2018) and Together Together (2021). He provided his voice to the animated films Everyone's Hero (2006), Monsters vs. Aliens (2009), The Lorax (2012), Captain Underpants: The First Epic Movie (2017) and Ron's Gone Wrong (2021).

He has received six Screen Actors Guild Award nominations for Outstanding Performance by an Ensemble in a Comedy Series, winning in 2008. He also received a Writers Guild of America Award for Best Writing for a Comedy or Variety Special for The Fake News with Ted Nelms (2018).

== Early life ==
Helms was born and raised in Atlanta, Georgia. He is of English, Scots-Irish, German, Dutch and French descent. He had open-heart surgery at age 13 to correct a severe congenital heart defect involving supravalvular aortic and pulmonic stenosis. According to Helms, his surgery lasted nine hours, and he was kept in an intensive care unit for one week after.

He attended Interlochen Center for the Arts as a youth and graduated in 1992 from The Westminster Schools, one year after The Office castmate Brian Baumgartner. Helms entered Oberlin College as a geology major, but graduated in 1996 with a Bachelor of Arts in film theory and technology. He spent a semester as an exchange student at New York University Tisch School of the Arts. During his college years, he turned down a summer internship with Late Night with Conan O'Brien because he had committed to an internship with WNBC's press and publicity department.

== Career ==
=== Early work ===
After graduating from Oberlin, Helms began his comedy and acting career as a writer and performer with New York City sketch comedy bands. While studying improvisation with the Upright Citizens Brigade troupe, he was a trainee film editor at Crew Cuts, a post-production facility in New York City, where he recorded some rough voiceover tracks that eventually led to paying voiceover work. He soon found a talent agent.

=== Television ===
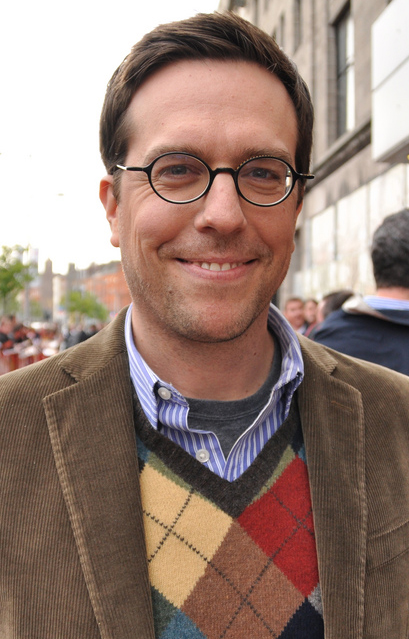
Helms in Dublin, Ireland, 2009

Helms was performing comedy in New York City when, as he recalled in a 2005 interview, "The Daily Show had a sort of open audition with a casting company that I had dealt with. I read for the part, and got it".

In his April 2002 to mid-2006 tenure on the satirical news program, Helms contributed "field reports" in addition to hosting various segments of the show such as "Digital Watch", "Ad Nauseam" and "Mark Your Calendar". He has also contributed to the "This Week in God" segment. His 2005 segment "Battle of the Bulge", about the wearing of Speedo bathing suits on the beaches of Cape May, New Jersey, and his "Mass. Hysteria" segment, where he reported criticism of Massachusetts when it became the first state to legalize gay marriage, are regarded by TV Guide as his signature segments.

Helms left the show in 2006 but occasionally returned for brief appearances over the next two years. On July 21, 2008, he returned for "Obama Quest"—a segment covering Senator Barack Obama's trip to Iraq. He also occasionally narrated the "Prescott Group" educational films on sister show The Colbert Report. In late July 2006, NBC announced that Helms was added to the cast of the mockumentary The Office, alongside fellow The Daily Show correspondent Steve Carell, in a recurring role as Andy Bernard, a nostalgic Cornell graduate who is obsessed with a cappella music. Helms was a series regular starting with the third season. "He had so much in common with this character we wanted to create," recalled Paul Lieberstein, a writer for the show who also plays Toby Flenderson, the human resources representative at the Scranton branch of Dunder Mifflin. "I can't remember when they started merging." Helms returned to The Daily Show on December 5, 2006, saying that he had been working "undercover at a paper company in Scranton", an allusion to his stint on The Office.

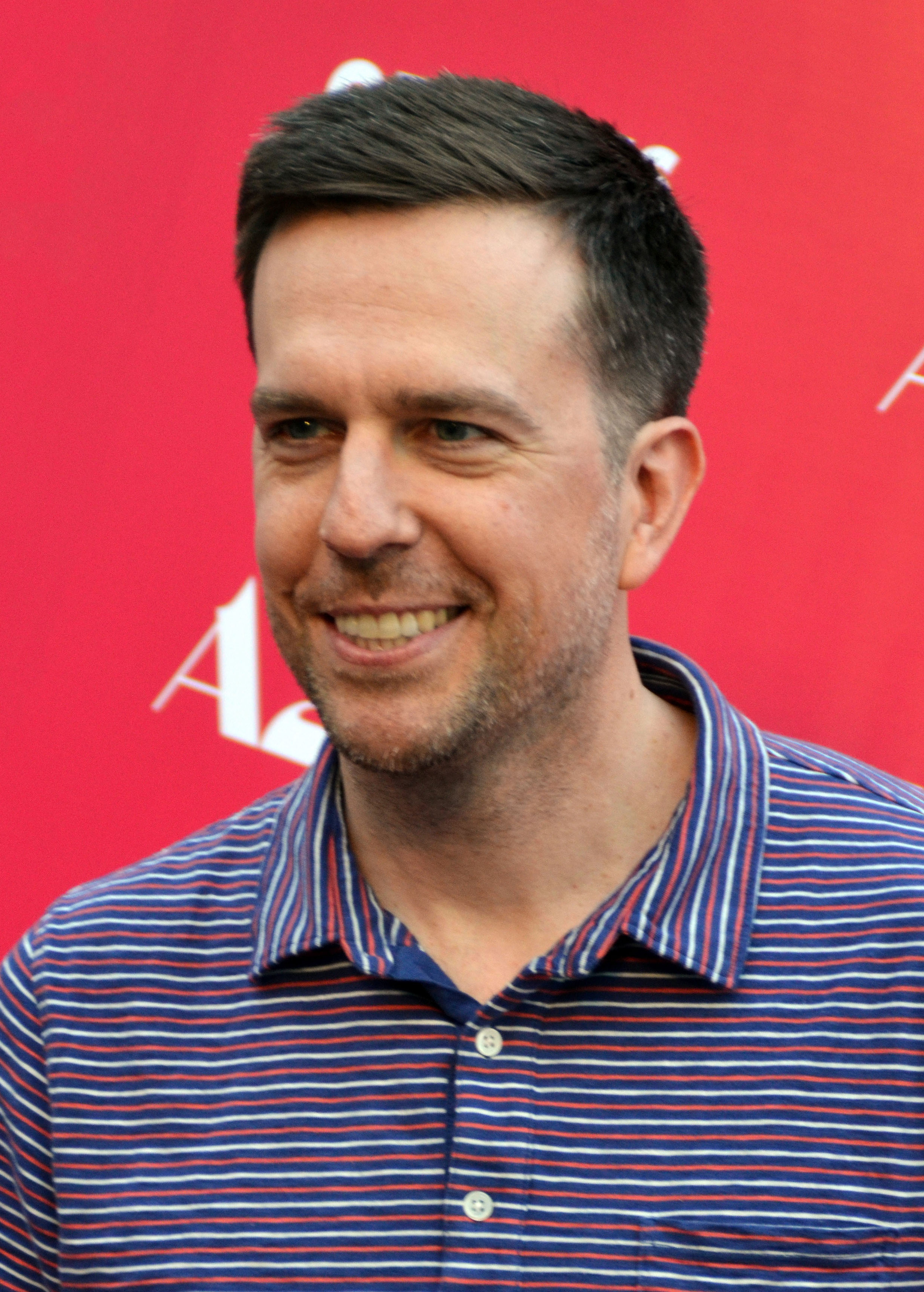
Helms at premiere of Obvious Child, 2014

In February 2007, NBC announced that Helms had been promoted to series regular on The Office. In February 2010, Helms was added to the show's opening credits. He quickly became a solidifying part of the cast, and one of the show's producers. In June 2009, in an interview with National Public Radio, he said that, like his character Andy Bernard, he had an interest in a cappella music.

Helms has also appeared on such television shows as The Mindy Project, Wilfred, NTSF:SD:SUV, Tanner on Tanner, Childrens Hospital, Arrested Development, and Cheap Seats, and in various Comedy Central specials. He was the celebrity guest on the August 3, 2015 survival-skills reality show Running Wild with Bear Grylls, coming to grips with his fear of heights on the Colorado Mountains. He has done commercial voiceover work in campaigns for Burger King, Doritos, Hotels.com, Sharp Aquos, and Advair asthma medication. He voices Neil the Angel, a character on Cartoon Network's Weighty Decisions series. He plays guitar, banjo, piano, as well as a sitar, in some of his entertainment performances.

He co-created the Peacock sitcom Rutherford Falls with Sierra Teller Ornelas (also the showrunner) and Michael Schur.

=== Film ===
Helms has had minor roles in numerous films including Night at the Museum: Battle of the Smithsonian, Blackballed: The Bobby Dukes Story, Meet Dave, Harold & Kumar Escape from Guantanamo Bay, I'll Believe You, Evan Almighty, Semi-Pro, Walk Hard: The Dewey Cox Story and The Goods: Live Hard, Sell Hard.

Helms co-starred in the blockbuster The Hangover (2009) and its sequels The Hangover Part II (2011) and The Hangover Part III (2013) as Stu Price, a dentist. All three films in the series were box office successes. Helms also starred in the 2011 film Cedar Rapids. He played the lead role, Rusty Griswold, in the 2015 film Vacation, a sequel/spin-off of the National Lampoon's Vacation series. Also in 2015 Helms starred in Jessie Nelson's movie, Love the Coopers. In 2017, he starred in The Clapper as Eddie Krumble, a paid audience member for infomercials. Helms played Joe Gargan in the 2018 film Chappaquiddick.

In 2012, Helms voiced the Once-ler in The Lorax. He also voiced the titular character in the DreamWorks animated film Captain Underpants: The First Epic Movie (2017).

=== Other work ===
Helms is in a bluegrass band called The Lonesome Trio with friends Ian Riggs and Jacob Tilove. They formed the band when they were at Oberlin College and still play a few shows every year. They recorded an eponymous album in summer 2013 shortly after appearing on the Bluegrass Situation stage at the Bonnaroo festival, which Helms curated. Helms is a self-confessed "bluegrass nerd" and founded the annual LA Bluegrass Situation festival. Helms plays banjo, guitar and piano.

He and Amy Reitnouer co-founded a music blog also titled The Bluegrass Situation. It summarizes its mission as "Creating and covering content across every level of the international scene, ranging from timeless traditional bluegrass, blues, and old-time to contemporary singer/songwriter, Americana, folk, and everything rootsy beyond and in between." On April 22, 2020, The Bluegrass Situation debuted The Whiskey Sour Happy Hour, a weekly music and comedy program benefiting the MusiCares COVID-19 Relief Fund and Direct Relief.

Helms features in the video for Mumford and Sons' song "Hopeless Wanderer". In 2015, he had a cameo appearance in the band's music video for the song "The Wolf".

Helms launched his own production company, Pacific Electric Picture Company, in 2013. The company had a two-year development deal with Universal Television.

In 2013, Helms co-wrote, produced, and starred in the Yahoo! Screen web series Tiny Commando, about a former Navy SEAL who is accidentally shrunken in a military experiment to four inches in height. Subsequently, he is deployed to places that his unique size enables him to infiltrate.

In 2024, Helms participated with his partner, Michael Falbo at Pacific Electric Picture Company, in SeriesFest 11's Storytellers Initiative to discover episodic content featuring uplifting and heartwarming comedies. The script competition provides artists the opportunity to share diverse ideas through visual media and create groundbreaking television. The winning artist(s) would receive the opportunity for a development deal with Pacific Electric Picture Co.

== Political views ==
Helms is a board member at RepresentUs, a non-profit group that works to pass anti-corruption laws in the United States.

Helms partnered with VoteRiders in 2022 to encourage volunteers to write letters and send texts to registered voters to let them know how to overcome voter ID barriers that could prevent them from casting a ballot.

In 2024, he appeared alongside Tim Walz at a rally in Reno, Nevada, in support of Kamala Harris's presidential campaign.

== Personal life ==
Helms is married and has two children. Helms has been diagnosed with ADHD.

== Honors ==
- Helms received an honorary Doctor of Fine Arts from Knox College, where he delivered the 2013 Commencement.
- In May 2014, Helms gave the convocation speech at Cornell University, alma mater of Andy Bernard, the character he portrayed on The Office.
- In May 2015, Helms gave the commencement speech at the University of Virginia.

== Filmography ==
=== Film ===
Year	Title	Role	Notes
2004	Blackballed: The Bobby Dukes Story	Bunker McLaughlin	Film debut
2006	Everyone's Hero	Hobo Louie (voice)	
2006	Night at the Museum	Dentist	Deleted scene
2007	Evan Almighty	Ark Reporter / Ed Carson	
2007	I'll Believe You	Leon	
2007	Walk Hard: The Dewey Cox Story	Stage Manager	
2008	Semi-Pro	Turtleneck Reporter	
2008	Confessions of a Shopaholic	Garret E. Barton	Uncredited
2008	Meet Dave	Number 2	
2008	Harold & Kumar Escape from Guantanamo Bay	Interpreter	
2008	Lower Learning	Maurice Bunting	
2009	The Smell of Success	Chet Pigford	
2009	The Hangover	Stuart "Stu" Price	also sung "Stu's Song" as part of the film's soundtrack
2009	Monsters vs. Aliens	News Reporter (voice)	Cameo
2009	Night at the Museum: Battle of the Smithsonian	Larry Daley's Assistant	Uncredited
2009	The Goods: Live Hard, Sell Hard	Paxton Harding	
2011	Cedar Rapids	Tim Lippe	Also executive producer
2011	The Hangover Part II	Stuart "Stu" Price	
2011	Jeff, Who Lives at Home	Pat	
2011	High Road	Barry	Uncredited
2012	The Lorax	The Once-ler (voice)	
2013	We're the Millers	Brad Gurdlinger	
2013	The Hangover Part III	Stuart "Stu" Price	
2014	Someone Marry Barry	Ben	
2014	They Came Together	Eggbert	
2014	Stretch	Karl-with-a-K	
2015	Vacation	Russell "Rusty" Griswold	
2015	Love the Coopers	Hank Cooper	
2016	Central Intelligence	—N/a	Executive producer
2016	Kevin Hart: What Now?	Bartender	
2017	The Clapper	Eddie Krumble	Also producer
2017	Captain Underpants: The First Epic Movie	Benjamin Krupp / Captain Underpants (voice)	
2017	Mune: Guardian of the Moon	Spleen (voice)	
2017	I Do... Until I Don't	Noah Brewing	
2017	Chappaquiddick	Joe Gargan	
2017	Father Figures	Peter Reynolds	
2018	A Futile and Stupid Gesture	Tom Snyder	Also executive producer
2018	Tag	Hogan "Hoagie" Malloy	
2019	Corporate Animals	Brandon	Also producer
2019	Penguins	Narrator (voice)	
2020	Coffee & Kareem	Officer James Coffee	
2021	Together Together	Matt	
2021	Ron's Gone Wrong	Graham Pudowski (voice)	
2023	Family Switch	Bill Walker	
2026	The Stunt Driver	Dick Keller	
2026	Smudge the Blades	Bud Bradshaw	
TBA	Babies	TBA	Post-production
TBA	She Gets It from Me	Albery	Post-production

=== Television ===
Year	Title	Role	Notes
2002	Premium Blend	Himself	Episode: "6.2"
2002–2009	The Daily Show	Correspondent	207 episodes
2004	Cheap Seats	Bradley Wallace	2 episodes
2004, 2013	Arrested Development	James Carr	3 episodes
2005	Sunday Pants	Neil the Angel (voice)	"Weighty Decisions" segments
2006	The Colbert Report	Narrator – The On Notice Board: A Wonder of the Modern Age	Episode: "Linda Hirshman"
2006	Samurai Love God	Samurai Love God (voice)	TV miniseries
2006–2013	The Office	Andy Bernard	Main cast (seasons 3–9); 163 episodes
2008	Upright Citizens Brigade	Guest Monologist	Uncredited
2008	American Dad!	Mr. Buckley (voice)	Episode: "Stanny Slickers II: The Legend of Ollie's Gold"
2008	Wainy Days	Doctor	Episode: "Angel"
2008–2010	Childrens Hospital	Doctor / TV Announcer	5 episodes
2009	Family Guy	Al Gore (voice)	Episode: "FOX-y Lady"
2010	Funny or Die Presents	Cast (Holdup)	4 episodes
2011	Saturday Night Live	Himself (host)	Episode: "Ed Helms/Paul Simon"
2011	Wilfred	Daryl	Episode: "Acceptance"
2011	NTSF:SD:SUV::	Eddie	2 episodes
2012	The Mindy Project	Dennis	2 episodes
2012	Ugly Americans	Dennis	Episode: "Mark Loves Dick"
2012	Comedy Bang! Bang!	Himself	Episode: "Ed Helms Wears A Grey Shirt & Brown Boots"
2013	Kroll Show	Sex in the City Dude	Episode: "San Diego Diet"
2013	Saturday Night Live	Ted Pelms	Uncredited; Episode: "Zach Galifianakis/Of Monsters and Men"
2014	Brooklyn Nine-Nine	Jack Danger	Episode: "USPIS"
2015	The Muppets	Himself	Episode: "Pig Out"
2015	Running Wild with Bear Grylls	Himself	Episode: "Ed Helms"
2015–2020	BoJack Horseman	Kyle (voice)	3 episodes
2016	Drunk History	William McMasters	Episode: "Scoundrels"
2017	Angie Tribeca	Dr. Clive Mister	Episode: "Germs of Endearment"
2017	The Fake News with Ted Nelms	Ted Nelms	TV special; also creator, writer and executive producer
2020	Aunty Donna's Big Ol' House of Fun	Ed Helms/Egg Helms	Also executive producer
2021–2022	Rutherford Falls	Nathan Rutherford	18 episodes; also co-creator, writer and executive producer
2022	Fraggle Rock: Back to the Rock	Lyle Craggle (voice)	2 episodes
2022	Big Mouth	Bros 4 Life Member #1 (voice)	Episode: "Dadda Dia!"
2023	Agent Elvis	Robert Goulet (voice)	4 episodes
2026	Rick and Morty	Big Mike (voice)	Episode: "Rick Days, Seven Nights"

=== Music videos ===
Year	Title	Artist
2013	"Hopeless Wanderer"	Mumford & Sons
2013	"Clouds" (Celebrity Music Video)	Zach Sobiech
2015	"The Wolf"	Mumford & Sons
2016	"Don't Wanna Know"	Maroon 5
2017	"Wanna Do Day"	Lisa Loeb

=== Web series ===
Year	Title	Role	Notes
2015	Jake and Amir	Mickey	Episode: "The Auditions"

== Bibliography ==
- Helms, Ed (2025). SNAFU: the Definitive Guide to History's Greatest Screwups. Grand Central. ISBN 978-1035430994.

== See also ==
- Historic recurrence
