= Crew Cuts =

Crew Cuts may refer to:

- The Crew-Cuts, the Canadian vocal quartet
- Crew Cuts (company), the New York-based post-production company

== See also ==
- Crew cut, a type of haircut
