= Joseph Gargan =

Ted Kennedy's cousin and Chappaquiddick confidante (1930–2017)

First Assistant United States Attorney for the District of Massachusetts
- In office 1961–1964
- Appointed by: John F. Kennedy

Personal details
- Born: Joseph Francis Gargan Jr. February 16, 1930 Boston, Massachusetts, U.S.
- Died: December 12, 2017 (aged 87) Lansdowne, Virginia, U.S.
- Party: Democratic
- Spouse: Betty Hurstel Gargan
- Relatives: Rose Fitzgerald Kennedy (aunt)
- Education: University of Notre Dame
- Occupation: Lawyer
- Known for: Kennedy cousin; Chappaquiddick incident

Joseph F. Gargan Jr. (February 16, 1930 – December 12, 2017), was an American lawyer and a nephew of Rose Fitzgerald Kennedy. He was one of only two men, along with Paul Markham, in whom Ted Kennedy chose to confide immediately after the Chappaquiddick automobile accident which killed Mary Jo Kopechne. Orphaned at the age of sixteen, Gargan spent two consecutive summers with the Kennedys, and, being closer in age to Ted than the other Kennedy brothers were, developed a close relationship with his cousin Ted. Gargan was the campaign chairman for Robert F. Kennedy's 1968 presidential campaign.

Gargan fell out of favor with the Kennedy family in 1988, with the publication of journalist Leo Damore's book, Senatorial Privilege: The Chappaquiddick Cover-Up, because Gargan revealed in interviews with Damore details not released in public testimony, such as how Ted Kennedy contemplated covering up his role in the incident by claiming Kopechne was driving his car.

== Early life ==
Gargan's father, Joseph Gargan Sr., was an amateur boxer, a University of Notre Dame football player and graduate, and a decorated World War I US Marine officer, who married Mary Agnes Fitzgerald, daughter of John F. Fitzgerald and sister of Rose Fitzgerald Kennedy. The Gargans had three children: Joseph Jr., Mary Jo, and Ann. Mary Agnes died on September 17, 1936. The children became orphaned when Joseph Sr. died in 1946..

Gargan grew up in Lowell, Massachusetts.

=== Relationship with Ted Kennedy ===
In the summer of 1940, when Gargan was 10 years old and Ted Kennedy was 8, Joe visited the Kennedy home at Hyannis Port. The Kennedys looked to Gargan to take Teddy under his wing as a peer big brother and keep him out of trouble, something his older brothers could not do because of their greater age difference.

=== Education ===
Despite lies spread by the Kennedys that Joseph Kennedy financed his orphan nephew's education, the estate of Gargan's father financed his secondary education at Georgetown Preparatory School, 1942–1948. For college, Gargan chose to attend Notre Dame as his father did, rather than Harvard as Joseph Kennedy and all of his sons did. Gargan said in 1983 that he considered Harvard "a crap school. In those days, you were kind of a fairy if you went to Harvard." Notre Dame provided a Catholic parochial education; he received his undergraduate degree in 1952, and graduated from Notre Dame Law School in 1955.

== Career ==
Gargan participated in Jack Kennedy's successful 1952 Senate campaign and 1960 presidential campaign, as well as Ted's 1962 and 1964 senate campaigns.

At Ted's request, Gargan became chairman of the Robert F. Kennedy 1968 presidential campaign. As such, he was responsible for getting three disparate, mutually distrustful groups to work together: Robert's own staffers, and the veterans of Jack's 1960 presidential campaign and Ted's 1962 and 1964 Senate campaigns.

=== Chappaquiddick ===
According to Ted Kennedy's account of events, sometime before or after midnight July 18–19, 1969, Kennedy accidentally drove his Oldsmobile into a tidal pond on Chappaquiddick Island, with Mary Jo Kopechne trapped inside the car. He walked just over a mile back to the cottage where a party he hosted was occurring, and summoned Gargan and Paul Markham to drive him back to the site, where Gargan dived into the pond in a futile attempt to find Kopechne.

After recovering, Gargan vehemently insisted that Kennedy report the accident to the police immediately. Markham seconded this opinion, but Kennedy argued against it, and according to Gargan, said he could plausibly deny knowledge of the accident if they agreed that he had gotten out of the Oldsmobile beforehand and Kopechne was the one who drove it off the bridge. Gargan said this lie was not safe, as neighbors could have seen their car at the bridge, and he would have no part of it. Finally, Kennedy said "All right, all right, I'll take care of it. You take care of the girls." He told Gargan and Markham to go back to the cottage and tell the other partygoers that Kopechne went back to Edgartown, but to say nothing about the accident. Gargan understood this at the time to mean that Kennedy would go to the police station and report the accident; however, he came to understand later that Kennedy thought it meant that Gargan and Markham would go along with his cover-up lie.

According to Gargan, Kennedy then abruptly cut off the discussion by jumping into the channel and swimming the 500 feet to the Edgartown shore. Kennedy in fact did not report the accident until about 9:50 a.m. that morning, after the Oldsmobile and Kopechne's body had been discovered.

Later, Kennedy used Gargan's and Markham's status as lawyers to falsely assert attorney-client privilege, preventing them from saying anything about the conversation on the island. Gargan was disappointed in his misjudgement of Kennedy's character, when he believed he would do the right thing.

== Personal life ==
He married Betty Hurstel, an Indiana native who worked at Notre Dame. Gargan was portrayed by Ed Helms in the 2017 film Chappaquiddick. In 2020, his son, Joseph E. Gargan, pleaded guilty "to embezzling nearly $8 million that was intended to settle claims by children who alleged they were victims of medical malpractice".

== Bibliography ==
- Damore, Leo (1988). Senatorial Privilege: The Chappaquiddick Cover-up. New York: Dell Publishing. ISBN 0-440-20416-X.
- "Joseph Gargan Obituary". Legacy.com. December 2017.
