= Esther Newberg =

American literary agent and political aide

Esther Newberg, originally from Middletown, Connecticut, is an American literary agent and former aide to Senator Robert F. Kennedy during his 1968 presidential campaign.

== Political career ==
Newberg attended Wheaton College, and joined Senator Robert F. Kennedy's staff in 1968. She was also a member of the presidential campaign staffs of Senator Edmund Muskie and Representative Mo Udall. She was one of the six "Boiler Room Girls" who socialized with Ted Kennedy and several others on the evening of Mary Jo Kopechne's death.

== Literary agent ==
Newberg is the senior vice president at International Creative Management, a talent agency in New York City. She has represented authors such as Carl Hiaasen (Skinny Dip) and Robert Iger, Patricia Cornwell (Sharp Force), Thomas Friedman, Michael Beschloss, Don Imus, Tom Hanks, Ina Garten, Chris Rock and Caroline Kennedy.

Newberg has also represented international best selling author Patricia Cornwell for decades, closing record breaking deals.
