= Paul F. Markham =

American lawyer

United States Attorney for the District of Massachusetts
- In office 1966–1969
- Appointed by: Lyndon B. Johnson
- Preceded by: Wendell Arthur Garrity Jr.
- Succeeded by: Herbert F. Travers, Jr.

Personal details
- Born: Paul Francis Markham; May 22, 1930 Lowell, Massachusetts, U.S.
- Died: July 13, 2019 (aged 89) Peabody, Massachusetts, U.S.
- Resting place: Wyoming Cemetery; Melrose, Massachusetts
- Education: Villanova University (BA); Boston University School of Law (JD)
- Occupation: Attorney

Paul Francis Markham (May 22, 1930 – July 13, 2019) was an American attorney who served as the United States Attorney for the District of Massachusetts from 1966 to 1969. He was one of two associates of Senator Edward M. Kennedy, in whom Kennedy confided most closely during the Chappaquiddick incident. Markham, along with Kennedy's cousin Joseph Gargan, participated in a futile attempt to rescue Mary Jo Kopechne from Kennedy's submerged car, and also wrote down Kennedy's dictated statement to the police about the accident.

== Early life and education ==
Markham was born in Lowell, Massachusetts on May 22, 1930. He attended Georgetown Preparatory School and then Villanova University. He dropped out to serve in the Coast Guard before returning to earn a Bachelor of Arts in economics. He would then attend the Boston University School of Law. He was admitted to the Massachusetts Bar in 1958. He worked at the personal injury firm of Badger, Parrish before joining the Small Business Administration.

== United States Attorney's office ==
In 1963, Markham was appointed by President John F. Kennedy to serve as an Assistant United States Attorney for the District of Massachusetts. When Wendell Arthur Garrity Jr. accepted a judgeship on the United States District Court for the District of Massachusetts in 1966, President Lyndon B. Johnson appointed Markham to succeed Garrity as the United States Attorney for the District of Massachusetts. He remained a U.S. Attorney until 1969 when he resigned to work in private practice, with the Boston firm of Moulton, Looney, Mazzone, Falk, & Markham.

== Chappaquiddick incident ==
Markham was present on Chappaquiddick Island, Massachusetts, on the night leading up to the death of Mary Jo Kopechne. According to the testimony of Senator Edward M. Kennedy, after the accident, he, Markham, and Joseph Gargan returned to the waterway to try to rescue Kopechne. Markham testified that Kennedy was sobbing and on the verge of becoming crazed. The next day Gargan and Markham joined Kennedy at his hotel where they had a "heated conversation" over the fact that Kennedy had not reported the accident.

In an October 15, 1994 interview for Ronald Kessler's book The Sins of the Father: Joseph P. Kennedy and the Dynasty He Founded, Gargan said that when he and Markham returned to the scene of the accident with Kennedy, they both urged Kennedy to report the accident to the police. Gargan told Kessler, a former Washington Post reporter. "The conversation was brief about having to report," Gargan told Kessler for the book. "I was insistent on it. Paul Markham was backing me up on it. Ted said, `Okay, okay, Joey, okay. I've got the point, I've got the point.' Then he took a few steps and dove into the water, leaving Markham and I expecting that he would carry out the conversation." But Kennedy did not report the matter to the police until later in the morning, Kessler's book notes.

After Kopechne's body was discovered, Kennedy dictated a statement to Markham which was then given to the police.

He was portrayed by Jim Gaffigan in the 2017 film Chappaquiddick.

== Later life and death ==
Markham died on July 13, 2019, aged 89. He was buried at Wyoming Cemetery in Melrose, Massachusetts.
