= Black Water (novella) =

1992 novella by Joyce Carol Oates

- First edition cover
- Author: Joyce Carol Oates
- Language: English
- Publisher: Dutton
- Publication date: May 1992
- Publication place: United States
- Media type: Print (hardback & paperback)
- Pages: 154 pp
- ISBN: 978-0-525-93455-4
- OCLC: 24698779
- Dewey Decimal: 813/.54 20
- LC Class: PS3565.A8 B47 1992

Black Water is a 1992 novella by the American writer and professor Joyce Carol Oates. It is a roman à clef based on the Chappaquiddick incident, in which U.S. senator Ted Kennedy crashed a car and caused the death by drowning of passenger Mary Jo Kopechne. The novella was a 1993 Pulitzer Prize finalist for fiction.

== Plot summary ==
The book opens with Elizabeth Anne "Kelly" Kelleher in a car that is plunging into mucky, swampy, "black water." The reader learns of the events that led up to the accident in flashbacks as the protagonist is drowning: Kelly Kelleher attends a Fourth of July party hosted by her friend Buffy St. John and her lover, Ray Annick. She is planning to stay with them for the weekend. Ray has invited "The Senator" about whom Kelly wrote her graduate thesis. He immediately is interested in her sexually; he pays attention solely to her as the party drags on, and they discuss their common political beliefs. The Senator follows Kelly to the beach where he kisses her, and then invites her to come to his hotel with him on the ferry. As she packs her bags, Buffy tries to convince her not to go or to go later but Kelly thinks that this is a once-in-a-lifetime chance and goes with him, despite the fact that he has been drinking and that she is not entirely sure that she is "ready" for any sort of relationship.

The Senator is drunk and takes the "old" Ferry Road instead of the "new" one; he is driving recklessly and drives directly through a guardrail into a marsh. The reader later finds that, had he made the turn, the car probably would have fallen into the water a short distance down the road at an old bridge. The car sinks passenger side-down.

At this point, The Senator uses Kelly's body to jettison himself upwards, out of the driver's side door. Kelly tries to hold on to him to pull herself free; he kicks her, leaving his shoe in her hand. Kelly, badly injured and delirious, continually imagines that he will come back to "save" her, and also that he has gone for help. She repeatedly imagines seeing him outside of the car, or that she feels the car shaking as he tries to get her out. She trusts The Senator until the very end of her life, certain that he will save her; it is possible that, because of this, she misses out on highly important lucid moments in which she could possibly save herself.

In reality, The Senator has stumbled to an outdoor phone booth, carefully staying out of sight of passing cars, to call Ray Annick. He tells Annick that Kelly became emotional and pushed the wheel because she was drunk, thus causing the accident, and that she has died.

Meanwhile, Kelly is following an ever-shrinking bubble of air to the top of the car. She panics and imagines that she is rescued and sent to the hospital where the "black water" is pumped from her stomach; this parallels an episode from college in which a roommate tried to die by suicide and had to have her stomach pumped. Kelly gets her imagery of the experience from the description of the other girl. The reader also learns about Kelly's own bout with suicidal thought and depression, triggered by the end of a relationship. Kelly had decided that she wants her life, that she wants to live, and this was part of the reason she decided to leave the party with The Senator in the first place.

She also repeatedly imagines her parents, and how she will explain to them that she is a "good girl" and argues that The Senator and his wife are separated, his children grown, and that their affair is causing no harm.

Kelly remembers an article she wrote arguing against the death penalty in which she details the more gruesome and torturous aspects of different methods of execution, which ultimately underscores the cruelty and horror of her death.

As Kelly grows closer and closer to death, her hallucinations become more vivid until she is imagining her parents, very old, watching her being pulled from the water in horror. She imagines herself as a child reaching up to be carried away.

The book ends with a line that is repeated throughout the book: "As the black water filled her lungs, and she died."

== Characters ==
- Elizabeth Anne Kelleher, a.k.a. Kelly Kelleher. The protagonist. She works for a magazine, Citizen's Inquiry. She wrote her thesis on The Senator. She is twenty-six years old, and suffers from acne and anorexia.
- The Senator, a Democratic U.S. Senator. He is hard of hearing, an aggressive driver, tall, and likes to drink. He has been married for thirty years, although he is separated from his wife.
- Artie Kelleher, Kelly's father. He is a staunch Republican.
- Madelyn Kelleher, Kelly's mother.
- Uncle Babcock, Kelly's hard-of-hearing uncle.
- Grandpa Ross, Kelly's grandfather.
- Buffy St. John, Kelly's best friend, she was her roommate at Brown University. She is twenty-six years old and works for a magazine, Boston After Hours.
- Ray Annick, Buffy's boyfriend. A mature lawyer who is friends with The Senator.
- Lisa Gardner, A girl who attempted suicide in college.
- Laura, Lisa's twin sister, who had also attempted suicide before college.

== Cultural references ==
The novel makes several references to both contemporary political and popular culture. Republican presidents George H. W. Bush and Ronald Reagan are both castigated in the narrative, while Bobby Kennedy and the Vietnam War are referred to as representing the cushy Democratic era. In Chapter 24, the Senator mentions the 1991 Gulf War.

The Beatles song "Eleanor Rigby" (1966) plays on the radio in Chapter 9, echoing the prosody of the novella. The Education of Henry Adams (1907) is quoted in Chapter 32.

The story parallels the 1969 Chappaquiddick accident, in which Mary Jo Kopechne drowned. In a New York Times interview, Oates said she began making notes for "a novel" in 1969, after she felt "a horrified fascination and sympathy" for the victim, who was in the car driven by Senator Edward Kennedy. ("But Ms. Oates insists 'Black Water' is not about Chappaquiddick per se. 'I wanted the story to be somewhat mythical, the almost archetypal experience of a young woman who trusts an older man and whose trust is violated.'")

== Literary significance and reception ==
Black Water was a National Book Critics Circle Award finalist in 1992, and was nominated for the Pulitzer Prize in 1993. The Rocky Mountain News, The Times, and Entertainment Weekly have all listed Black Water as one of Joyce Carol Oates's best books.

In 1993, the composer John Duffy suggested that Oates adapt Black Water into an opera; seeing it "as a chance to 'rewrite the work'", and Oates expanded the role of the Senator and began working on the libretto. The opera Black Water had its first workshop in 1995, and premiered at the American Music Theater Festival in April 1997.

That same year, the composer Jeremy Beck also wrote to Oates, requesting permission to adapt Black Water into a monodrama for soprano and piano. Oates gave Beck permission to do so, indicating that she herself was creating a libretto for the Duffy project, but noting that their respective approaches would result in very different operatic works. Beck's monodrama was first premiered in a concert version in 1995 at the University of Northern Iowa; it did not receive its stage premiere until April, 2016, at the Center for Contemporary Opera production at Symphony Space's Thalia Theater in New York City.

In 2007, The New York Times Book Review editor Dwight Garner wrote that Amanda Plummer's "cool, dark telling" of Black Water was "the best book on tape ever recorded".
