= Chappaquiddick (film) =

2017 film by John Curran

- Theatrical release poster
- Directed by: John Curran
- Written by: Taylor Allen; Andrew Logan
- Produced by: Mark Ciardi; Chris Cowles; Campbell G. McInnes
- Starring: Jason Clarke; Kate Mara; Ed Helms; Jim Gaffigan; Clancy Brown; Olivia Thirlby; Bruce Dern
- Cinematography: Maryse Alberti
- Edited by: Keith Fraase
- Music by: Garth Stevenson
- Production company: Apex Entertainment
- Distributed by: Entertainment Studios Motion Pictures
- Release dates: September 10, 2017 (TIFF); April 6, 2018 (United States)
- Running time: 101 minutes
- Country: United States
- Language: English
- Budget: $34 million
- Box office: $18.3 million

Chappaquiddick is a 2017 American political drama film directed by John Curran, and written by Taylor Allen and Andrew Logan. The film stars Jason Clarke as U.S. Senator from Massachusetts Ted Kennedy and Kate Mara as Mary Jo Kopechne, with Ed Helms, Bruce Dern, Jim Gaffigan, Clancy Brown, and Olivia Thirlby in supporting roles. The plot details the 1969 Chappaquiddick incident, in which Kennedy's negligence caused an automobile accident which resulted in the death of his 28-year-old passenger Mary Jo Kopechne trapped inside the vehicle, and the Kennedy family's response.

Principal photography began in Boston, in September 2016. The film originally premiered at the Gala Presentations section at the Toronto International Film Festival on September 10, 2017, and was released in the United States on April 6, 2018, by Entertainment Studios. The film was released under the title The Senator in the United Kingdom. It received generally positive reviews from critics, with praise for its balanced screenplay and Clarke's performance.

== Plot ==
In July 1969, U.S. Senator Ted Kennedy (D–MA) is asked in an interview how it feels to stand in the shadow of his dead brothers John and Bobby. Then he phones his cousin Joe Gargan and tells him to book hotel rooms on Martha's Vineyard for the Boiler Room Girls, who worked for Bobby's presidential campaign. He travels to Chappaquiddick Island, where he meets Gargan and Paul Markham for a sailboat race. After losing, Kennedy goes to a party at a cottage with five friends and six Boiler Room Girls.

Kennedy leaves the party with Mary Jo Kopechne. On the road, they encounter a police officer, who asks if they need help. Kennedy backs up and drives quickly away. He accidentally drives off the Dike Bridge, causing the car to flip over before it submerges into a pond. Kennedy climbs out of the vehicle, and calls out to Kopechne, but receives no response. He sits down and cries, before walking back to the cottage. He summons Gargan and Markham, and they drive quickly to the bridge. Gargan and Markham attempt multiple times to retrieve Kopechne from the overturned vehicle, but are unable to open any of the doors or windows. They insist Kennedy report the incident immediately, but instead, he gets in a rowing boat, and Gargan and Markham row him to Edgartown, where they go their separate ways.

Kennedy walks past the phone booth outside his hotel and up to his room and gets undressed. He takes a bath, gets dressed, and combs his hair. He goes down to the phone and calls his father Joseph P. Kennedy Sr. for advice. His partially-paralyzed father says one word: "alibi". Kennedy sits on the steps outside his room. He asks the night porter the time, which is 2:25 a.m. Kennedy claims he is having trouble sleeping, but he goes to sleep without contacting the police.

The next morning, the overturned vehicle is discovered by father-and-son fishermen, who call the police. Police Chief Arena and the fire department recover Kopechne's body from the car, which they find is registered to Kennedy. Gargan and Markham realize that he has not reported the accident, and insist again that he must. Kennedy goes with Markham to the Edgartown Police Department and commandeers the Chief's office, waiting for his return.

After giving the Chief a statement written by Markham, Kennedy travels to the family compound in Hyannisport, believing he has contained the situation. He is shocked as his father tells him his actions have disgraced the family and is surprised by a damage control team led by Robert McNamara, convened to address the legal (potential charge of manslaughter) and political consequences. First, they make sure the body is not examined again, and that the official record that his licence has expired is changed by a Kennedy-friendly official. Then they craft a strategy to push the court hearing after the current news cycle, dominated by the landing of the first men on the Moon. Kennedy attends Kopechne's funeral wearing a neck brace to gain sympathy, but this ploy backfires in the press.

Kennedy suggests an appeal to the people of Massachusetts on national television, which his damage control team heartily endorses. They use the family's influence to resolve the court case without a trial, where anything he says publicly could be used against him. Kennedy receives the minimum sentence by pleading guilty to leaving the scene of an accident: two months' jail time, which the judge suspends based on Kennedy's character and good standing.

Gargan, who has become increasingly disgusted with Kennedy for not being honest about the facts of the case and attempting to play the victim, attempts to resign. Kennedy, having just been slapped by his father, tells Gargan he intends to resign from the Senate and asks him to draft a resignation speech. He tells Gargan not to tell anyone.

As Kennedy is ready to go on national television with the speech prepared by Ted Sorensen, designed to elicit public sympathy, Gargan gives Kennedy the resignation speech, telling him it is the right thing to do. But Kennedy throws it away, and Gargan is pressed to hold Kennedy's cue cards for Sorensen's speech. Although the public has mixed views, the majority interviewed say they would re-elect him.

The credits explain that Joseph Kennedy Sr. died soon after the incident; Gargan became estranged from the family; and Kennedy lost the 1980 Democratic Party presidential primaries but continued in the U.S. Senate for another forty years after the incident.

== Cast ==
- Jason Clarke as Ted Kennedy
- Kate Mara as Mary Jo Kopechne
- Ed Helms as Joseph Gargan
- Jim Gaffigan as Paul Markham
- Clancy Brown as US Secretary of Defense Robert McNamara
- Taylor Nichols as Ted Sorensen
- Olivia Thirlby as Rachel
- Bruce Dern as Joseph Kennedy

== Production ==
On December 14, 2015, it was announced that Sam Taylor-Johnson would direct the film, though she later dropped out. On April 25, 2016, it was announced Jason Clarke would play Ted Kennedy, with John Curran directing. On July 7, 2016, Kate Mara and Ed Helms joined the cast, to play Mary Jo Kopechne and Joseph Gargan, respectively. On July 20, 2016, Bruce Dern was added as Joseph P. Kennedy Sr., while Jim Gaffigan and Olivia Thirlby joined the cast on August 31, 2016, and principal photography began in Boston on September 7, 2016.

The car crash was filmed on a recreation of the Dike Bridge in a water tank at Baja Studios in Rosarito, Baja California, Mexico.

== Release ==
On September 8, 2017, Entertainment Studios acquired distribution rights to the film for $4 million. The film premiered at the 2017 Toronto International Film Festival on September 10. The film was initially scheduled for an awards season release, on December 8, 2017, but was moved back to April 6, 2018. The studio spent $16 million on prints and advertising.

== Reception ==
=== Box office ===
In the United States and Canada, Chappaquiddick grossed $17.4 million, with $0.9 million in other territories, for a worldwide total of $18.3 million, against a budget of $34 million. It opened at No. 7, its first of two consecutive weeks in the Top 10 at the domestic box office. It was the 16th highest-grossing independent film of 2018.

=== Critical response ===
On the review aggregator website Rotten Tomatoes, 80% of 145 critics' reviews are positive, with an average rating of 7.0/10. The website's consensus reads: "Chappaquidick can't help leaving some of this true story's most intriguing questions unanswered, but it's bolstered by outstanding work from Jason Clarke in the central role." Metacritic, which uses a weighted average, assigned the film a score of 67 out of 100, based on 33 critics, indicating "generally favorable" reviews.

Todd McCarthy of The Hollywood Reporter called the film methodical and lacking passion, writing: "It's doubtful that many Americans under the age of 40 or so even know what the name Chappaquiddick refers to, which might in itself provide solid justification for making a film about it. But the drama of the tragic July 18, 1969, accident... needed more energetic and incisive treatment than it receives in this sober, somewhat slack telling."

=== Response by journalists and politicians ===
In a March 2018 interview, Byron Allen, CEO of Entertainment Studios, which distributed the film, stated that "there are some very powerful people who tried to put pressure on me not to release this movie". Boston Herald journalist Howie Carr speculated that this was a reference to Chris Dodd, who had been a longtime friend and ally of Kennedy's when he served in the U.S. Senate, and had more recently been president of the Motion Picture Association of America.

American journalist, writer and film critic Neal Gabler, who at the time was writing a biography of Ted Kennedy, criticized the film as a mix of "conjecture and outright fabrication". As one example, he stated, "Contrary to the film's implications, Mr. Kennedy immediately and forever after felt deep remorse and responsibility for the accident; it haunted him." Similarly, longtime Kennedy aide and speechwriter Bob Shrum criticized the film for "trafficking in conspiracy theories", stating that Kennedy had never tried to cover up or minimise his responsibility for Kopechne's death.

Conservative commentator Mark Steyn called Chappaquiddick an "excellent film" that shows how the "acidic glamour of power corrodes" Kennedy and many of those around him. He also stated his opinion that one exchange in the film was based on something he (Steyn) had written previously: in the film, Kennedy remarks that even acclaimed historical figures, such as Moses, had personal flaws, and his cousin Joe Gargan retorts, "Moses didn't leave a girl at the bottom of the Red Sea." Steyn noted that he had written something very similar in response to a 2009 column by Joan Vennochi praising Kennedy after his death.

=== Accolades ===
Year	Festival	Category	Nominee(s)	Result
2018	19th Golden Trailer Awards	Best Drama	Entertainment Studios and mOcean	Nominated
2018	35th Miami International Film Festival	Jordan Alexander Ressler Screenwriting Award for Best Screenplay	Taylor Allen and Andrew Logan	Nominated
