= Crew Cuts (company) =

- Industry: Post-production, production, visual effects, film editing, sound design, 3D, motion graphics, finishing
- Founded: 1986
- Headquarters: New York City, U.S.
- Website: www.crewcuts.com

Crew Cuts is a New York-based full service post-production company founded in 1986 by Chuck Willis, Clayton Hemmert, and Steve Kraftsow. Sherri Margulies joined as a partner in 1989. Crew Cuts specializes in online and offline editing, visual effects, 3D and motion graphics, audio and sound design, finishing, and aspects of production, for the commercials, shorts, features, and web distribution. The original Crew Cuts was housed in one floor of a townhouse on East 47th Street. Within seven years Crew Cuts had taken over the entire townhouse and moved to its current location, the former New Yorker magazine offices, on the top floor of 28 West 44th Street. The 44th Street space was a showpiece created by architect Peter Wormser with 360-degree views of mid-town Manhattan including 30 Rockefeller Plaza. At one time the editors of Crew Cuts scored Gold, Silver, and Bronze Lions at Cannes in one year. In that same year Pepsi "Boy In The Bottle" edited by Chuck Wilis, was the number 1 rated Super Bowl commercial of all time. In 1997 Crew Cuts editor Sherri Margulies brought home a Grammy for the Beatles Free as a Bird Video and the first ever Emmy for a TV commercial, HBO Chimps, both directed by Joe Pytka. In 2003 Willis's Visa "Sheens" received an Emmy nomination for Best Commercial. At the height of its success, Crew Cuts had offices in New York City, Santa Monica, and San Francisco with an additional award-winning effects company called Quietman helmed by Johnny Semerad and a sound studio called Buzz with partner Mike Marinelli. Crew Cuts clients include: Chase, Comcast, GE, Gillette, HBO, Pepsi, SAP AG, Time Warner Cable, and Verizon. Crew Cuts’ work has gained recognition ranging from the Clio Awards to the Grammy Awards.
