= Mary Jo Kopechne =

American teacher, secretary, and campaign specialist (1940–1969)

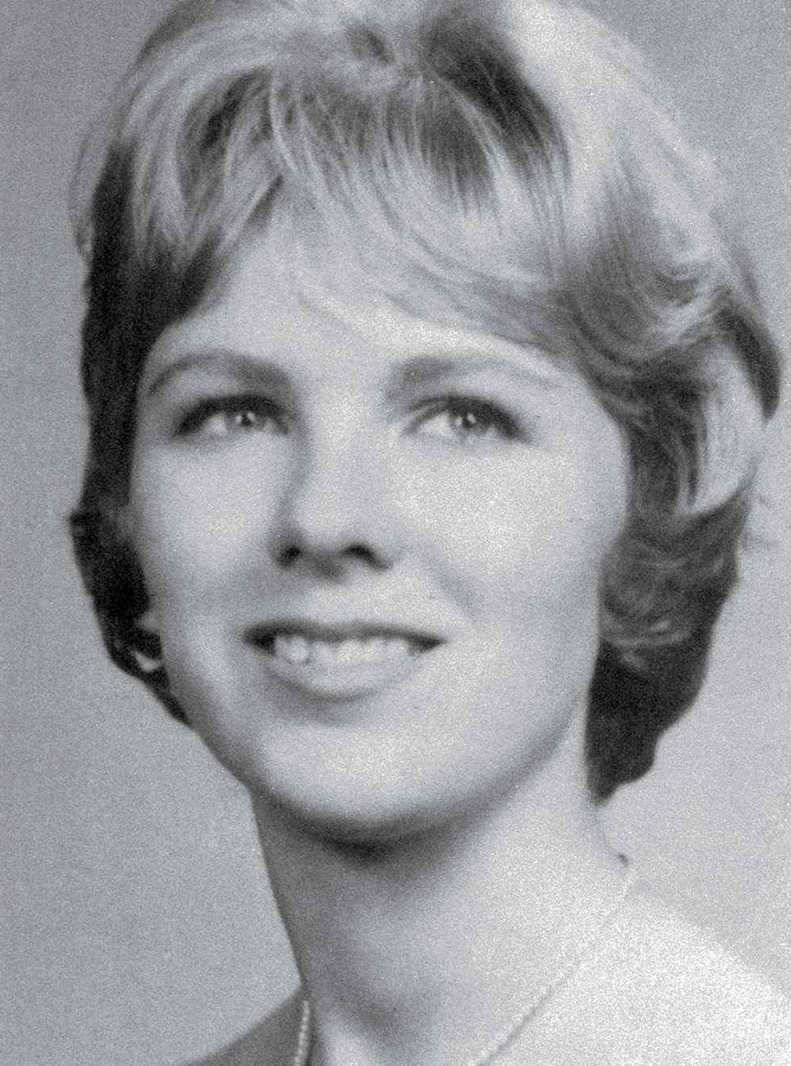
- 1962 college yearbook portrait
- Born: July 26, 1940; Wilkes-Barre, Pennsylvania, U.S.
- Died: July 18 or 19, 1969 (aged 28); Poucha Pond, Chappaquiddick Island, Massachusetts, U.S.
- Cause of death: Drowning
- Burial place: Larksville, Pennsylvania, U.S.
- Education: Caldwell College
- Occupations: Teacher, secretary, political campaign worker
- Known for: Victim of Chappaquiddick incident
- Political party: Democratic
- Parent(s): Joseph and Gwen Kopechne

Mary Jo Kopechne (/koʊˈpɛkni/; July 26, 1940 – July 18 or 19, 1969) was an American secretary, and one of the campaign workers for U.S. senator Robert F. Kennedy's 1968 presidential campaign, a close team known as the "Boiler Room Girls". In 1969, she drowned in a car driven by Robert's brother, U.S. senator Ted Kennedy, which left a narrow road on Chappaquiddick Island and overturned into Poucha Pond after they had left a party. According to reports, Kennedy left the party at 11:15 p.m. Kopechne's body and the car were not reported missing until the next morning, approximately nine to ten hours later.

== Early life and education ==
Kopechne was born in Wilkes-Barre, Pennsylvania, although she is sometimes described as being from nearby Forty Fort, Pennsylvania. She was the only child of homemaker Gwen (née Jennings) and insurance salesman Joseph Kopechne. Kopechne was of part-Polish heritage through her father. Her grandfathers both worked as coal miners in Luzerne County, Pennsylvania. Her family history in the Wyoming Valley area of northeastern Pennsylvania traces back 250 years on her maternal side.

When Kopechne was an infant, her family moved to Berkeley Heights, New Jersey. She was raised Catholic and attended parochial schools, graduating in 1958 from Our Lady of the Valley High School in Orange, New Jersey. She graduated with a degree in business administration from Caldwell College for Women in 1962.

== Career ==
Kopechne was inspired by President John F. Kennedy's inaugural command "Ask what you can do for your country". After graduation, Kopechne moved to Montgomery, Alabama, for a year at the Mission of St. Jude, which participated in the Civil Rights Movement. She also taught business classes in typing and shorthand at Montgomery Catholic High School, and was an advisor to the school newspaper. One former student recalled her as

"a petite strawberry blonde with pep in her step. She had confidence and a zest for life that was intriguing. ... She was humble and kind, and stood firm in her beliefs. ... Tough, but fun in the classroom, creating speed challenges, expecting accuracy, and rewarding generously."

By 1963, Kopechne relocated to Washington, D.C., to work as secretary for United States Senator George Smathers (D-FL). She joined the secretarial staff of Senator Robert F. Kennedy (D-NY), following his election in November 1964. For that office, she worked as a secretary to the senator's speechwriter, and as a legal secretary to one of his legal advisers. Kopechne was a loyal worker. Once, during March 1967, she stayed up all night at Kennedy's Hickory Hill home, to type a major speech against the Vietnam War, while the senator and his aides such as Ted Sorensen made last-minute changes to it. She enthusiastically participated on the Kennedy office softball team, playing catcher.

During the 1968 U.S. presidential election, Kopechne helped with the wording of Kennedy's March speech that announced his presidential candidacy. During his campaign, she worked as one of the Boiler Room Girls, the affectionate nickname given to six young women whose office area was in a hot, loud, windowless location in Kennedy's Washington campaign headquarters. They were vital in tracking and compiling data and intelligence on how Democratic delegates from various states were intending to vote; Kopechne's responsibilities included Pennsylvania. Kopechne and the other staffers were knowledgeable politically, and were chosen for their ability to work skillfully for long, hectic hours on sensitive matters. They talked daily with field managers, and also helped distribute policy statements to strategic newspapers. She has been described as hero-worshiping the senator.

Kopechne was devastated emotionally by the assassination of Robert F. Kennedy in June 1968. After working briefly for the Kennedy proxy campaign of George McGovern, she said that she could not return to work on Capitol Hill, saying: "I just feel Bobby's presence everywhere. I can't go back because it will never be the same again." But as her father later said, "Politics was her life". In September 1968, she was hired by Matt Reese Associates, a Washington, D.C., firm that helped establish campaign headquarters and field offices for politicians, and was one of the first political consulting companies. In the fall elections of 1968, Kopechne did work on the re-election campaign of Senator Joseph S. Clark, Jr. (D-PA), who eventually lost.

She was also assigned to recruit volunteers in Colorado for former Governor Stephen McNichols's run for the Senate against incumbent Republican Senator Peter H. Dominick. McNichols lost his run, and Kopechne returned to Washington, D.C. By mid-1969, she had completed work for the eventually successful mayoral campaign of Thomas J. Whelan in Jersey City, New Jersey. She was on her way to a successful professional career; one of the political professionals who worked with her in Jersey City characterized her as "an exceptionally hard-working and skillful professional who knew her craft".

Kopechne lived with three other women in the Washington neighborhood of Georgetown. She was a fan of the Boston Red Sox, and of fellow Polish American Carl Yastrzemski. She was a devout Roman Catholic, with a demure, serious, "convent school" demeanor, and rarely drank much.

== Death ==
On July 18, 1969, Kopechne attended a party on Chappaquiddick Island, off the east coast of Martha's Vineyard, Massachusetts. The celebration was in honor of the dedicated work of the Boiler Room Girls, and was the fourth such reunion of Robert Kennedy campaign workers. Robert's surviving brother, Senator Ted Kennedy, was there. Kopechne reportedly left the party with Kennedy at 11:15 p.m.; according to his account, he had offered to drive her to catch the last ferry back to Edgartown, where she was staying. She did not tell her close friends at the party that she was leaving, and she left her purse and keys behind. Kennedy drove the 1967 Oldsmobile Delmont 88 off a narrow, unlit bridge, which lacked guardrails and was not on the route to Edgartown. The vehicle landed on its roof in Poucha Pond. Kennedy extricated himself from the vehicle and survived, but neglected to inform authorities of the accident until the next day.

Assistant Medical examiner Donald Mills signed a death certificate, listing cause of death as accidental drowning. A private funeral for Kopechne was held at St. Vincent's Roman Catholic Church in Plymouth, Pennsylvania, on July 22, 1969. The service was attended by Kennedy, his wife Joan, his sister-in-law Ethel, and hundreds of onlookers. Kopechne is buried in St. Vincent's Cemetery in Larksville, Pennsylvania, in the parish cemetery on the side of Larksville Mountain. She was among the fifth generation of her family interred in that cemetery.

The exact time and cause of Kopechne's death is not positively known, due to conflicting witness testimony at the January 1970 inquest, and lack of an autopsy.

- Kennedy said the accident occurred shortly after he left the party at 11:15 p.m. on July 18. But part-time Deputy Sheriff Christopher "Huck" Look testified that he saw Kennedy's car, with Kopechne and Kennedy in it, around 12:40 a.m. on July 19.
- John Farrar, the fire rescue captain who retrieved the body on July 19, testified he believed that Kopechne stayed alive for up to half an hour in an air pocket, and ultimately suffocated in the submerged vehicle. A petition to exhume the body for autopsy was denied by a Pennsylvania court.

Kennedy failed to report the incident to the authorities until the car and Kopechne's body were discovered the next morning. Kopechne's parents said that they learned of their daughter's death from Kennedy, before he informed authorities of his involvement. They learned that Kennedy had been the driver from wire press releases some time later.

== Aftermath ==
A week after the incident, Kennedy pleaded guilty to leaving the scene of an accident after causing injury. He received a two-month suspended sentence. On a national television broadcast that night, Kennedy said that he had not been driving "under the influence of liquor", nor had he ever had a "private relationship" with Kopechne. Massachusetts officials pressed for weeks to have Kopechne's body exhumed for an autopsy, but in December 1969, a Pennsylvania judge sided with the parents' request not to disturb her burial site.

The Chappaquiddick incident and Kopechne's death is the topic of a number of non-fiction books, as well as a novella by Joyce Carol Oates. Even otherwise sympathetic, mainstream biographers believed there were outstanding serious questions about Kennedy's timeline of events that night, specifically his actions following the incident. The quality of the investigation has been scrutinized, particularly whether official deference was given to a powerful and influential politician and his family. The events surrounding Kopechne's death damaged Kennedy's reputation, and are regarded as a major reason why he was never able to mount a successful campaign for President of the United States and essentially chose not to pursue the office. Kennedy would eventually overcome this and some lesser personal scandals to have a very long career as a Senator and to achieve a lengthy list of major legislative accomplishments.

Kennedy expressed his remorse over his role in Kopechne's death in his posthumously published memoir, True Compass (2009). But the disparity of the outcomes remained; Kennedy biographer Peter Canellos has written of the aftermath: "Every day that he lived was one that Kopechne – a talented woman with political interests of her own – would not. It seemed cosmically unfair that he should have a second act when she couldn't even complete her first."

Kopechne's parents received a $141,000 settlement from Kennedy's insurance company. They subsequently moved to Swiftwater, Pennsylvania. On the 25th anniversary of her death, in 1994, they said that Kennedy had never apologized directly to them over his role in it, but that other members of the Kennedy family had written letters to them. With their only child gone, they never felt that justice had really been done in the case.

Kopechne's father died in a nursing home in East Stroudsburg, Pennsylvania, in 2003. Her mother died in a nursing home in Plains Township, Pennsylvania, in 2007.

== Legacy ==
In 2015, two cousins of Kopechne's in Pennsylvania self-published the book Our Mary Jo, which sought to emphasize the influence of her life, rather than discuss Kennedy or Chappaquiddick. It also includes some of the hundreds of condolence letters that Kopechne's parents received. Because Kopechne had been a strong believer in education and was deeply Catholic, family members started a scholarship fund in Kopechne's name at nearby Misericordia University.

In 2017, Kopechne was portrayed by actress Kate Mara in John Curran's film Chappaquiddick. Mara gives Kopechne a sympathetic interpretation, although much of the film takes place after her death.

A full biography, Before Chappaquiddick: The Untold Story of Mary Jo Kopechne (2020), was written by William C. Kashatus and published by Potomac Books. Kashatus has said that he spent more than a decade researching the work, inspired by Kopechne as an exemplar of the culture of the Wyoming Valley area,

"where the people have a strong work ethic, very strongly Catholic at that period of time, and they raised their kids to respect themselves, respect other people, and work hard. And she really represented that to me."
