= 1968 New Hampshire Democratic presidential primary =

- March 12, 1968
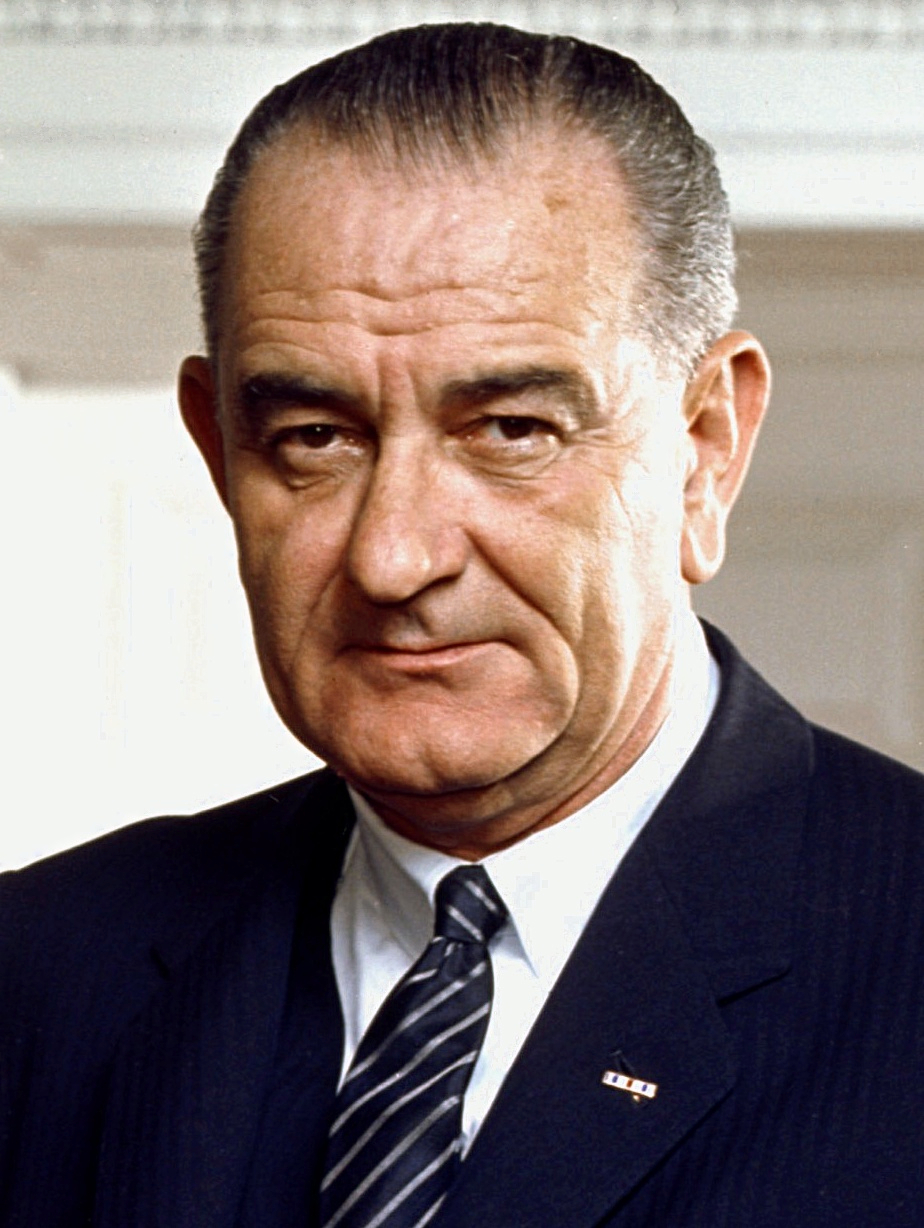

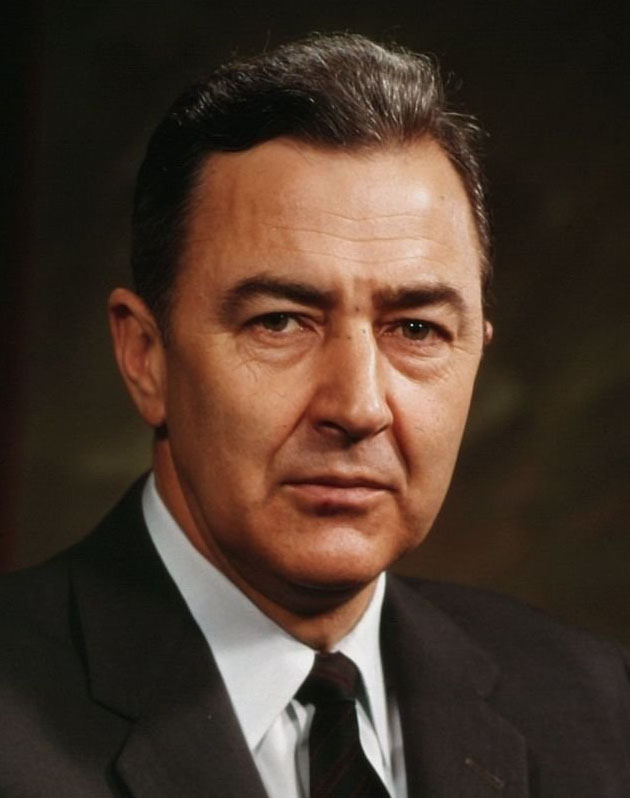
Candidate	Lyndon Johnson (write-in)	Eugene McCarthy
Home state	Texas	Minnesota
Delegate count	4	20
Popular vote	27,520	23,263
Percentage	49.6%	41.9%
- County results Johnson: 40-50% 50-60% McCarthy: 40-50% 50-60%

The 1968 New Hampshire Democratic presidential primary was held on March 12, 1968, in New Hampshire as one of the Democratic Party's statewide nomination contests ahead of the 1968 United States presidential election. Although President Lyndon B. Johnson defeated Senator Eugene McCarthy in the non-binding presidential preference primary with 49% of the vote, McCarthy's superior organization allowed him to win twenty of the state's twenty-four pledged delegates; Johnson's poor performance in New Hampshire precipitated his decision not to run for re-election, which he announced on March 31.

== Background ==
As opposition to President Johnson's handling of the Vietnam War grew in 1967, antiwar Democrats led by Allard Lowenstein and Curtis Gans formed the Dump Johnson movement, which sought to challenge the President's re-election. Their first choice was Robert Kennedy, who had sufficiently established himself as a critic of the war and an effective popular campaigner. He declined, as did a series of lesser-known candidates, including Senator George McGovern. Lowenstein finally found a candidate in October 1967, when Minnesota Senator Eugene McCarthy agreed to challenge the President. At first, McCarthy merely expressed his interest, telling Lowenstein, "Somebody has to raise the flag." On November 30, 1967, McCarthy publicly announced his campaign for the nomination.

Kennedy continued to demur, despite pressure from his aides to enter the race and worry that antiwar allies, like George McGovern, would begin to make commitments to McCarthy. On January 30, he again indicated to the press that he had no plans to campaign against Johnson.

In early February 1968, after the Tet Offensive in Vietnam, Kennedy received an anguished letter from writer Pete Hamill, noting that poor people in the Watts area of Los Angeles had hung pictures of Kennedy's brother, President John F. Kennedy, in their homes. Hamill's letter reminded Robert Kennedy that he had an "obligation of staying true to whatever it was that put those pictures on those walls." There were other factors that influenced Kennedy's decision to enter the presidential primary race. On February 29, 1968, the Kerner Commission issued a report on the racial unrest that had affected American cities during the previous summer. The Kerner Commission blamed "white racism" for the violence, but its findings were largely dismissed by the Johnson administration.

On March 10, Kennedy told his aide, Peter Edelman, that he had decided to run and had to "figure out how to get McCarthy out of it." However, Kennedy hesitated to enter the race with McCarthy still in and agreed to McCarthy's request to delay an announcement of his intentions until after the New Hampshire primary.

== Campaign ==
Running as an antiwar candidate, McCarthy hoped to pressure the Democrats into publicly opposing the Vietnam War. Trailing badly in national polls and with little chance to influence delegate selection absent primary wins, McCarthy decided to pour most of his resources into New Hampshire. He was boosted by thousands of young college students who volunteered throughout the state, who shaved their beards and cut their hair to "Get Clean for Gene."

== Results ==
This primary election was a nonbinding vote and described as being a "presidential preference poll".

Candidate	Number of votes	% of the vote	Delegates
Lyndon B. Johnson (write-in)	27,243	49.4%	4
Eugene McCarthy	23,280	42.2%	20
Richard Nixon (write-in)	2,529	4.6%	
Robert F. Kennedy (write-in)	600	1.1%	
Nelson Rockefeller (write-in)	248	0.4%	
George C. Wallace (write-in)	197	0.4%	
Other candidates (write-in)	1,089	1.9%	
Total	55,186	100%	24

On March 12, McCarthy was the only person on the ballot, as Johnson had not filed, and was only a write in candidate. McCarthy won 42% of the primary vote to Johnson's 49%, an extremely strong showing for such a challenger which gave McCarthy's campaign legitimacy and momentum. In addition, McCarthy's superior coordination led to a near sweep of the state's twenty-four pledged delegates; since Johnson had no formal campaign organization in the state, a number of competing pro-Johnson delegate candidates split his vote, allowing McCarthy to take twenty delegates.

== Aftermath ==
Despite his desire to oppose Johnson directly and the fear that McCarthy would split the antiwar vote, Kennedy pushed forward with his planned campaign. On March 16, Kennedy declared, "I am today announcing my candidacy for the presidency of the United States. I do not run for the presidency merely to oppose any man, but to propose new policies. I run because I am convinced that this country is on a perilous course and because I have such strong feelings about what must be done, and I feel that I'm obliged to do all I can." However, due to his late entry, Kennedy's name would not appear on a state ballot until the Indiana primary on May 7.

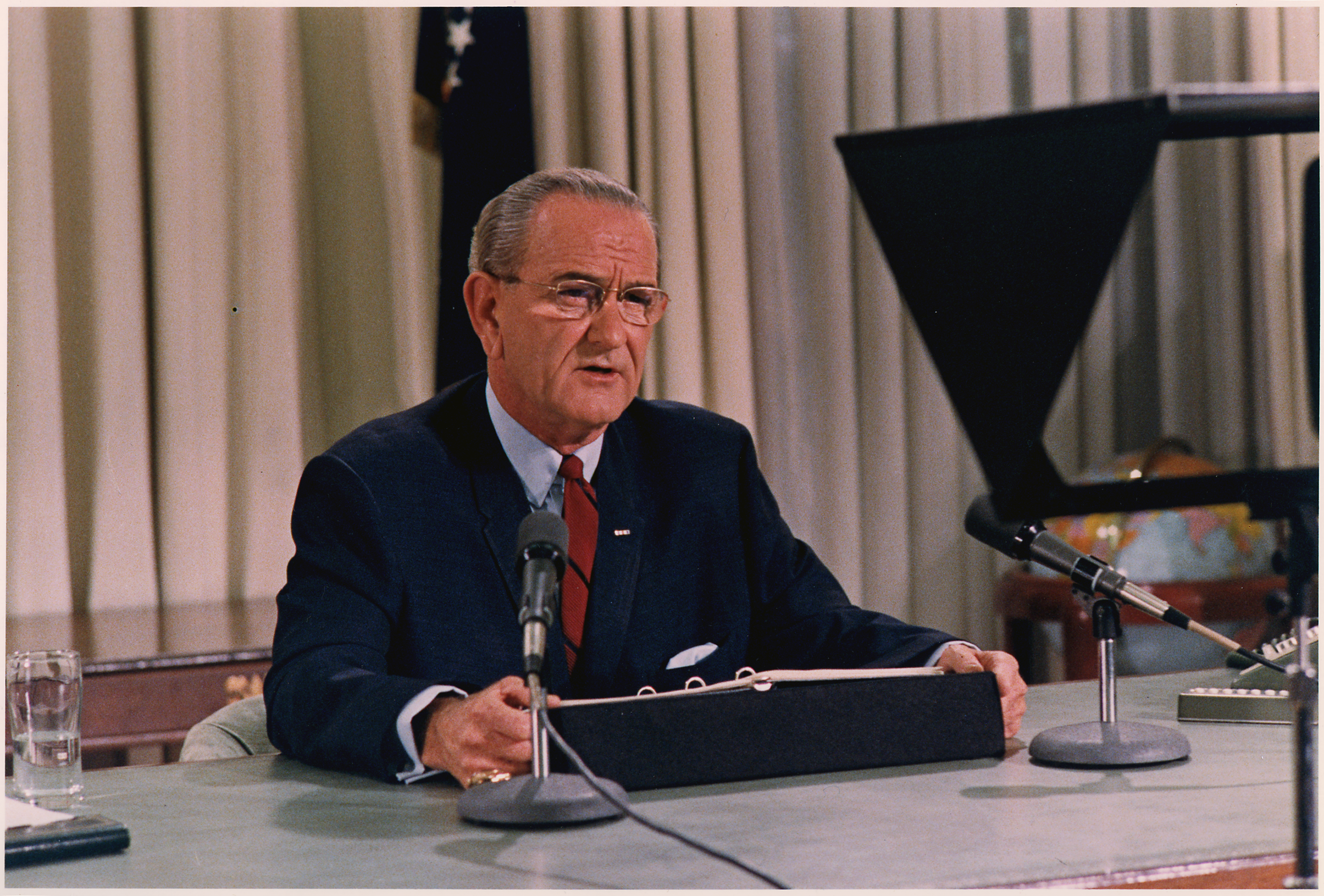
President Lyndon B. Johnson delivers a speech announcing he will not run for re-election on March 31.

Johnson now had two strong challengers, both sitting members of the Senate with demonstrated popularity. To make matters worse, polling in Wisconsin showed McCarthy beating Johnson badly, with the latter getting only 12% of the vote. Facing declining health and bleak political forecasts in the upcoming primaries, Johnson concluded that he could not win the nomination without a major political and personal struggle. On March 31, 1968, at the end of a televised address on Vietnam, he shocked the nation by announcing that he would not seek re-election. By withdrawing, he could avoid the stigma of defeat and could keep control of the party machinery to support Vice President Hubert Humphrey. As the year developed, it also became clear that Johnson believed he could secure his place in the history books by ending the war before the election in November, which would give Humphrey the boost he would need to win.

Vice President Hubert Humphrey went on to be nominated after Robert F. Kennedy was assassinated in June.
