= Watkins, Minnesota =

City in Minnesota, United States

- City
- Location in Meeker County and the state of Minnesota
- Coordinates: 45°18′55″N 94°24′44″W
- Country: United States
- State: Minnesota
- County: Meeker

Area
  - Total: 0.69 sq mi (1.78 km^{2})
  - Land: 0.69 sq mi (1.78 km^{2})
  - Water: 0 sq mi (0.00 km^{2})
- Elevation: 1,165 ft (355 m)

Population (2020)
  - Total: 991
  - Density: 1,441.3/sq mi (556.48/km^{2})
- Time zone: UTC-6 (Central (CST))
  - Summer (DST): UTC-5 (CDT)
- ZIP code: 55389
- Area code: 320
- FIPS code: 27-68620
- GNIS feature ID: 2397216
- Website: www.cityofwatkins.com

Watkins is a city in Meeker County, Minnesota, United States. The population was 991 at the 2020 census.

== History ==
A post office has been in operation at Watkins since 1887. Watkins was named by railroad officials.

== Geography ==
Watkins is in northeastern Meeker County, 1 mile (1.6 km) south and west of the Stearns County line. Minnesota State Highway 55 passes through the southern part of the city, leading east 5 miles (8 km) to Kimball and west 7 miles (11 km) to Eden Valley. Litchfield, the Meeker county seat, is 16 miles (26 km) to the southwest.

According to the U.S. Census Bureau, Watkins has a total area of 0.69 square miles (1.79 km^{2}), all land. The city sits at the headwaters of the Clearwater River, which flows southeast, then northeast to the Mississippi River at the city of Clearwater.

== Demographics ==
Historical population
Census	Pop.	Note	%±
1900	250		—
1910	366		46.4%
1920	454		24.0%
1930	518		14.1%
1940	584		12.7%
1950	659		12.8%
1960	744		12.9%
1970	785		5.5%
1980	757		−3.6%
1990	849		12.2%
2000	880		3.7%
2010	962		9.3%
2020	991		3.0%
U.S. Decennial Census

=== 2010 census ===
As of the census of 2010, there were 962 people, 398 households, and 236 families living in the city. The population density was 1,354.9 inhabitants per square mile (523.1/km^{2}). There were 438 housing units at an average density of 616.9 per square mile (238.2/km^{2}). The racial makeup of the city was 98.8% White, 0.5% African American, 0.2% Native American, 0.2% Asian, and 0.3% from other races. Hispanic or Latino of any race were 0.4% of the population.

There were 398 households, of which 35.4% had children under the age of 18 living with them, 41.5% were married couples living together, 9.5% had a female householder with no husband present, 8.3% had a male householder with no wife present, and 40.7% were non-families. 36.9% of all households were made up of individuals, and 16.6% had someone living alone who was 65 years of age or older. The average household size was 2.29 and the average family size was 2.97.

The median age in the city was 36.9 years. 28.1% of residents were under the age of 18; 5% were between the ages of 18 and 24; 25.8% were from 25 to 44; 21.4% were from 45 to 64; and 19.6% were 65 years of age or older. The gender makeup of the city was 47.2% male and 52.8% female.

=== 2000 census ===
As of the census of 2000, there were 880 people, 336 households, and 206 families living in the city. The population density was 1,722.7 inhabitants per square mile (665.1/km^{2}). There were 367 housing units at an average density of 718.4 per square mile (277.4/km^{2}). The racial makeup of the city was 99.32% White, 0.34% African American, 0.11% Asian, and 0.23% from two or more races. Hispanic or Latino of any race were 0.57% of the population.

There were 336 households, out of which 32.1% had children under the age of 18 living with them, 49.1% were married couples living together, 8.3% had a female householder with no husband present, and 38.4% were non-families. 32.7% of all households were made up of individuals, and 19.0% had someone living alone who was 65 years of age or older. The average household size was 2.41 and the average family size was 3.07.

In the city, the population was spread out, with 25.6% under the age of 18, 8.1% from 18 to 24, 25.6% from 25 to 44, 15.6% from 45 to 64, and 25.2% who were 65 years of age or older. The median age was 38 years. For every 100 females, there were 99.1 males. For every 100 females age 18 and over, there were 94.4 males.

The median income for a household in the city was $32,188, and the median income for a family was $41,786. Males had a median income of $35,435 versus $19,318 for females. The per capita income for the city was $15,950. About 6.7% of families and 12.2% of the population were below the poverty line, including 9.2% of those under age 18 and 16.2% of those age 65 or over.

== Notable person ==
- Eugene McCarthy, U.S. senator and 1968 presidential candidate
