= List of vice presidents of the United States who ran for president =

List of specific presidential candidates

22 of the 50 vice presidents of the United States have attempted a run for the presidency after being elected vice president. Six have been elected to the presidency, or almost a third of running vice-presidents, while eight have lost the presidential election, and one (Mike Pence) has dropped out. Eleven have earned the primary nomination in their party, with most of them winning the presidency. Seven unsuccessfully sought the presidential nomination of their party. Additionally, fourteen vice presidents ran while they were in office.

The list excludes the nine vice presidents who ascended to the presidency due to a vacancy, and then sought an additional full term for president. (Note: These vice presidents include John Tyler, Millard Fillmore, Andrew Johnson, Chester A. Arthur, Theodore Roosevelt, Calvin Coolidge, Harry S. Truman, Lyndon B. Johnson, and Gerald Ford.)

== List of vice presidents who ran for president ==
Vice presidents with their numbers in bold won the presidency.

| Year | Vice President (dates of service as Vice President) | Popular vote (%) | Electoral college | Party | President |
|---|---|---|---|---|---|
| 1796 (Note: Election occurred prior to the Twelfth Amendment to the United States Constitution which formalized the process for electing the president and vice president. Prior to the Twelfth Amendment, the vice president was the runner-up in the presidential election.) | **John Adams** (Note: Ran as the incumbent Vice President.) (Apr 21 1789 − Mar 4 1797) | **35,726 (53.4%)** | **71/138** | Federalist | George Washington |
| 1800 | **Thomas Jefferson** (Mar 4 1797 − Mar 4 1801) | **41,330 (61.4%)** | **73/138** | Democratic-Republican | John Adams |
| 1808 | **George Clinton** (Mar 4 1805 − Apr 20 1812) | Did not receive nomination | | Democratic-Republican | Thomas Jefferson |
| 1836 | **Martin Van Buren** (Mar 4 1833 − Mar 4 1837) | **764,176 (50.8%)** | **170/294** | Democratic | Andrew Jackson (Democratic) |
| 1848 | **Martin Van Buren** (Mar 4 1833 − Mar 4 1837) | 291,475 (10.1%) | 0/290 | Free Soil Party | Andrew Jackson (Democratic) |
| 1860 | **John C. Breckinridge** (Mar 4 1857 − Mar 4 1861) | 848,019 (18.1%) | 72/303 | Southern Democratic | James Buchanan |
| 1908 | **Charles W. Fairbanks** (Mar 4 1905 − Mar 4 1909) | Did not receive nomination | | Republican | Theodore Roosevelt |
| 1916 | **Charles W. Fairbanks** (Mar 4 1905 − Mar 4 1909) | Did not receive nomination | | Republican | Theodore Roosevelt |
| 1920 | **Thomas R. Marshall** (Mar 4 1913 − Mar 4 1921) | Did not receive nomination | | Democratic | Woodrow Wilson |
| 1940 | **John Nance Garner** (Note: Ran as the incumbent Vice President against the incumbent President.) (Mar 4 1933 − Jan 20 1941) | Did not receive nomination | | Democratic | Franklin D. Roosevelt |
| 1948 | **Henry A. Wallace** (Note: Was a member of the Democratic Party while serving as Vice President of the United States, but ran for president under the short lived Progressive Party that he co-founded.) (Jan 20 1941 − Jan 20 1945) | 1,157,328 (2.37%) | 0/531 | Progressive | Franklin D. Roosevelt |
| 1952 | **Alben W. Barkley** (Jan 20 1949 − Jan 20 1953) | Did not receive nomination | | Democratic | Harry S. Truman |
| 1960 | **Richard Nixon** (Jan 20 1953 − Jan 20 1961) | 34,108,157 (49.5%) | 219/537 | Republican | Dwight D. Eisenhower |
| 1968 | **Hubert Humphrey** (Note: Incumbent Vice President who did not seek the presidency until the incumbent President dropped out of the race for reelection.) (Note: Humphrey initially expected to remain as Johnson's running mate for reelection until Johnson withdrew from the race on March 31, 1968.) (Jan 20 1965 − Jan 20 1969) | 31,271,839 (42.7%) | 191/538 | Democratic | Lyndon B. Johnson |
| 1968 | **Richard Nixon** (Jan 20 1953 − Jan 20 1961) | **31,783,783 (43.4%)** | **301/538** | Republican | Dwight D. Eisenhower |
| 1972 | **Hubert Humphrey** (Jan 20 1965 − Jan 20 1969) | Did not receive nomination | | Democratic | Lyndon B. Johnson |
| 1984 | **Walter Mondale** (Jan 20 1977 − Jan 20 1981) | 37,577,352 (40.6%) | 13/538 | Democratic | Jimmy Carter |
| 1988 | **George H. W. Bush** (Jan 20 1981 − Jan 20 1989) | **48,886,597 (53.4%)** | **426/538** | Republican | Ronald Reagan |
| 2000 | **Dan Quayle** (Jan 20 1989 − Jan 20 1993) | Did not receive nomination | | Republican | George H. W. Bush |
| 2000 | **Al Gore** (Jan 20 1993 − Jan 20 2001) | 50,999,897 (48.4%) (Note: Won the popular vote, but lost the presidency through the Electoral College.) | 266/538 | Democratic | Bill Clinton |
| 2020 | **Joe Biden** (Jan 20 2009 − Jan 20 2017) | **81,283,501 (51.3%)** | **306/538** | Democratic | Barack Obama |
| 2024 | **Mike Pence** (Jan 20 2017 − Jan 20 2021) | Did not receive nomination | | Republican | Donald Trump |
| 2024 | **Kamala Harris** (Note: Harris initially expected to remain as Biden's running mate for reelection until Biden withdrew from the race on July 21, 2024.) (Jan 20 2021 − Jan 20 2025) | 75,017,613 (48.4%) | 226/538 | Democratic | Joe Biden |
