= Eugene McCarthy 1968 presidential campaign =

American political campaign

- Campaign: 1968 U.S. presidential election
- Candidate: Eugene McCarthy; U.S. senator (1959–1971)
- Affiliation: Democratic Party
- Status: Announced: November 30, 1967; Lost nomination: August 29, 1968
- Slogan(s): Get Clean for Gene; To Begin Anew... We Shall Overcome

Eugene McCarthy, a U.S. senator from Minnesota, announced his candidacy in the 1968 Democratic party primaries against incumbent President Lyndon B. Johnson in November 1967, on a platform of ending American involvement in the Vietnam War. McCarthy's campaign was popular with young people and hippies who felt disillusioned from the government.

Following McCarthy's second-place finish in the New Hampshire primary, Senator Robert F. Kennedy entered the race, and President Johnson announced his withdrawal from the race. After Johnson's withdrawal, Vice President Hubert H. Humphrey entered the contest but avoided the primaries.

Kennedy fought it out with McCarthy in the primaries, as Humphrey used favorite son stand-ins to help him win delegates to the Democratic National Convention. Kennedy was assassinated, leaving Humphrey as McCarthy's main challenger. However, Humphrey's organization was too strong for McCarthy to overcome, and his anti-war campaign was split after the late entrance of Senator George McGovern of South Dakota just ahead of the Democratic National Convention. Despite winning the popular vote, McCarthy lost to Humphrey at the convention amidst protests and riots.

== Background ==
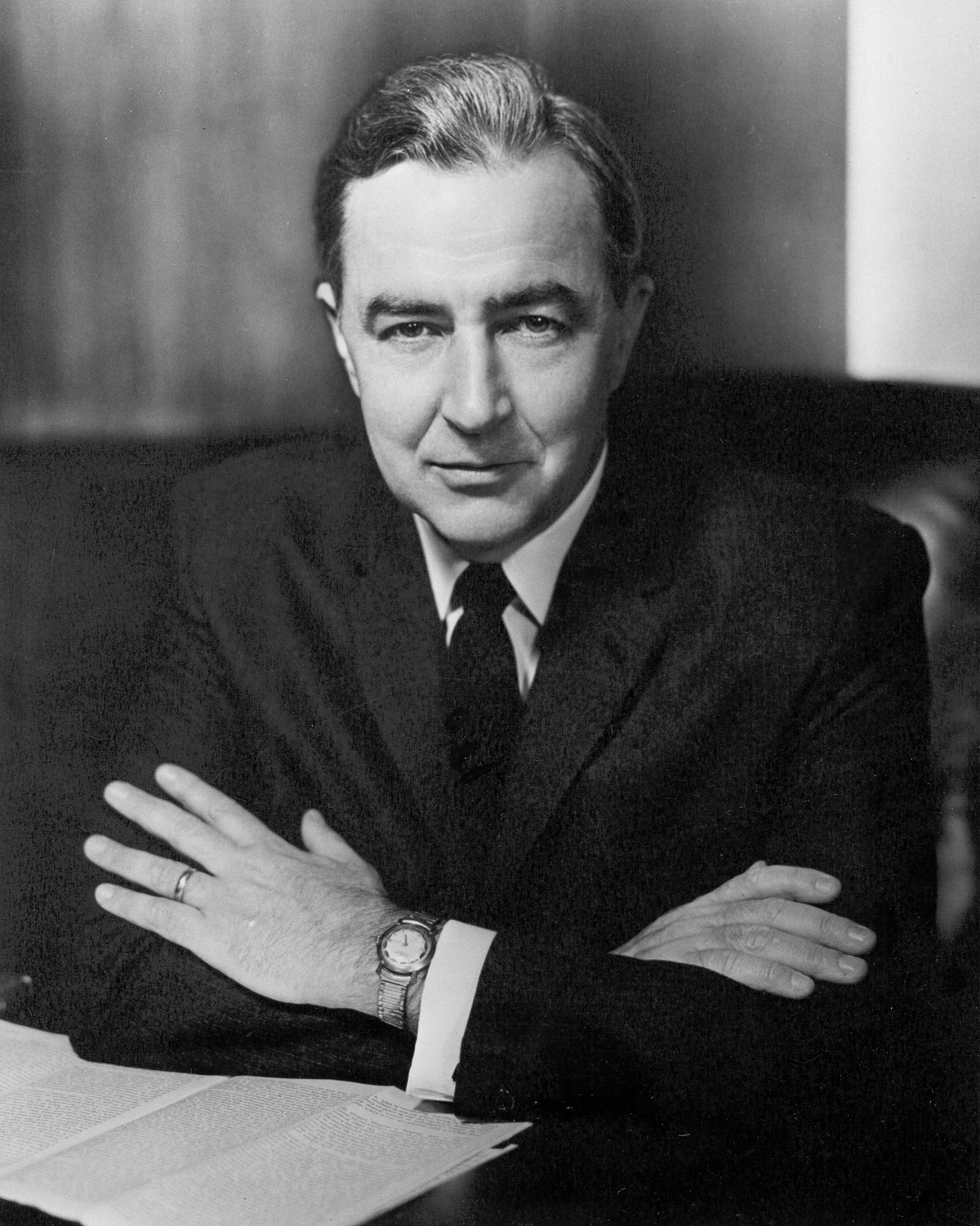
Senator Eugene McCarthy

Eugene McCarthy was first elected to the United States House of Representatives in 1948 as a member of the Minnesota Democratic–Farmer–Labor Party. He served five terms before winning a seat in the United States Senate in 1958. His speech at the 1960 Democratic National Convention in support of Adlai Stevenson placed him on the national stage. President Johnson considered selecting him as his running mate in 1964, but instead chose fellow Senator Hubert Humphrey of Minnesota. McCarthy vehemently opposed the Vietnam War.

Months prior to his announcement, McCarthy hinted that he would challenge President Johnson for the Democratic nomination due to his contrasting views with the president on the Vietnam War. The Americans for Democratic Action announced that they would support McCarthy's campaign if he decided to run. Johnson took these mentions seriously, privately confiding to Democratic congressional leaders that McCarthy could gain the support of Martin Luther King Jr. and Dr. Benjamin Spock, splintering the party. It was rumored that McCarthy had $100,000 pledged to use on the New Hampshire and Wisconsin primaries in the upcoming year. One politician explained to Johnson that McCarthy's run could be reminiscent of Estes Kefauver, whose 1952 campaign in the early primaries is speculated to have caused President Harry S. Truman to not seek re-election. McCarthy privately explained his intentions to Vice President Hubert Humphrey with whom he had served Minnesota in the Senate for nearly two decades. He commented that he did not believe he could win, but that he had "lost interest" in the Senate and felt "very strongly about the war", believing that the best way to express himself was to "go on out and enter the primaries." Humphrey stated that McCarthy was "more vain and arrogant than his supporters wanted to admit", but that he did not decide to run for president because of his personal feelings for Johnson, but his genuine feelings about the Vietnam War.

== Challenging the incumbent ==
I run because this country is now involved in a deep crisis of leadership; a crisis of national purpose – and a crisis of American ideals. It is time to substitute a leadership of hope for a leadership of fear. This is not simply what I want, or what most of us want. It is, I believe, the deepest hunger of the American soul.

— Eugene McCarthy

Citing the importance of preventing President Johnson's nomination, and the continuation of the war in Vietnam, McCarthy entered his name into four Democratic presidential primaries on November 30, 1967. Upon his entrance, the senator articulated that he believed there was a "deepening moral crisis" in America with the rejection of the political system by citizens, and a helplessness he hoped to alleviate as president. A few days later, the Johnson administration made an announcement on the war in Vietnam that, McCarthy said, was akin to an escalation. He believed that such an announcement would only strengthen his own campaign. The following week, rumors spread among the president's staff that the McCarthy campaign was a ploy to weaken Johnson and make it easier for Senator Robert F. Kennedy to defeat him. Kennedy had announced that he would not challenge Johnson for the nomination, but a presidential candidacy was not ruled out. Prior to challenging Johnson, McCarthy encouraged Kennedy to enter the race.

McCarthy began January by making no promises about a potential challenge of the president on the Florida primary ballot, but reaffirmed his goal to defeat the president in New Hampshire. The next day, he appeared as the first guest of the half-hour ABC news series Issues and Answers, and discussed his views on pertinent campaign issues. He claimed the North Vietnamese government was willing to negotiate, and that any further bombing should be halted to forge an end to the hostilities. As President Johnson prepared for his annual State of the Union Address, McCarthy requested equal time from television networks after the president discussed the McCarthy-Kennedy conspiracy theory the previous month. The request was rejected. Later in the month, McCarthy delivered a speech in front of 6,500 students at University Park, Pennsylvania, that criticized the Johnson administration for being "afraid to negotiate" with the North Vietnamese. This came as Robert Kennedy commented that he would support Johnson as the nominee, even though his views more closely resembled McCarthy's, predicting that the campaign would have a "healthy influence" on Johnson, whom he picked to ultimately win the nomination. Near the end of January, McCarthy campaigned in St. Louis, where he continued his anti-war rhetoric, describing the Vietnam War as against "American tradition" and declared that "no nation has a right" to "destroy a nation" with the rationale of "nation building". He then discussed his support for normalized relations with Cuba. After seven weeks of campaigning, McCarthy concluded that his speeches were coming across more as poetry than substantive campaign messages. As he traveled through California, a stop in Stanford was greeted by newspaper headlines that asked the candidate whether he "want[ed] to make righteous speeches ... or end the Viet Nam War." As his candidacy continued, McCarthy and his staffers worked to improve the campaign's "passion gap".

=== Primary campaign begins ===
As McCarthy planned to visit Miami, Florida, Democratic bigwigs decided to stage their own rally in the state. It was unclear if the plan had developed from the White House, but diversionary tactics were used to take away attention from a McCarthy appearance when establishment Democrats scheduled a meeting of their own on the same days in Tallahassee. The purpose of McCarthy's visit was to campaign and begin discussion about the presidential nominating slate for the May 28 Florida primary. He discussed civil rights during the trip, remarking that "it would take 30 to 50 years of constant action and concern to carry out all promises to the emancipated Negro who has been treated as a colonial people in America." Following the speech, the Conference of Concerned Democrats unanimously decided to award him pledged delegates from the state of Florida. Meanwhile, an anonymous poll showed that no members of Congress described McCarthy as the strongest candidate for the Democratic nomination, with the majority naming President Johnson. However, he gained the endorsement of the Americans for Democratic Action, who failed to support an incumbent Democratic president for the first time in 20 years. Later on, McCarthy announced that he would take part in the Pennsylvania primary, turning in 3,400 signatures on the filing deadline.

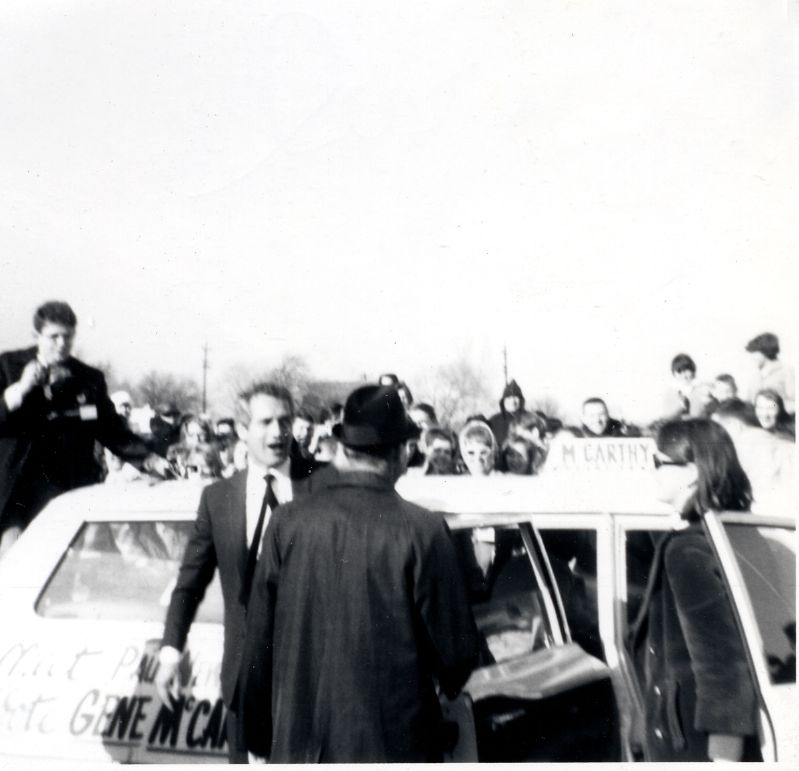
Actor Paul Newman at a McCarthy rally in Wisconsin

Endorsements
- Neil Simon
- Tony Randall
- Larry Blyden
- Paul Newman
- Tallulah Bankhead
- Arthur Miller
- Eli Wallach
- Steve Allen
- Bette Davis
- Leonard Nimoy
- Dick Van Dyke
- Alan Jay Lerner
- Sonny Fox
- Burt Lancaster
- Eva Marie Saint
- Darren McGavin
- Jill St. John
- Barbra Streisand
- Carl Reiner
- Woody Allen
- Adolf Green
- Melvyn Douglas
- Betty Comden
- Alan Arkin
- Myrna Loy
- Anne Jackson
- Representative Don Edwards of California

The month of March kicked off with charges from the media that McCarthy's campaign was just dragging along. Cited was his tardiness to the Senate floor, which failed to prevent a Southern filibuster against a civil rights bill drafted by fellow Minnesota Senator Walter Mondale. Despite the setback, three precincts in Minnesota elected McCarthy-supported delegates to caucuses, to the detriment of Vice-President Hubert Humphrey, and President Johnson decided to abandon Massachusetts, giving 72 delegates to McCarthy. He described the news as "encouraging". At this point, McCarthy had spent a large amount of time campaigning in New Hampshire, hoping to improve his standing before the state's critical primary. Meanwhile, President Johnson's campaign circulated the slogan that "the communists in Vietnam are watching the New Hampshire primary ... don't vote for fuzzy thinking and surrender." McCarthy likened this statement to McCarthyism, a reference to Senator Joe McCarthy of Wisconsin. Opinion polls prior to the New Hampshire primary showed that McCarthy's support stood at only 10 to 20 percent. Although he did not win the contest, he stunned spectators of the race by winning a surprising 42.2 percent of the vote to Johnson's 49.4 percent. Media outlets described the results as a "moral victory" for McCarthy, and influenced Robert Kennedy's decision to enter the race on March 16. Kennedy's announcement did not affect McCarthy's campaign. He remained committed to the "young people" who had supported his campaign all along, and remarked that he was "better qualified to run for the presidency" than Kennedy. McCarthy set his sights on Wisconsin and began to prepare for the state's April primary. He ran advertisements in newspapers throughout the state and included his platform. In it, he called for "more federal aid for education", collective bargaining rights for farmers, "a guaranteed minimum livable income for all Americans", the construction of "at least one million new housing units each year, and more "federal funds to stop pollution". While in Wisconsin, he criticized the government of South Vietnam, saying that it would be "too kind" to label the entity as corrupt and a dictatorship. He then announced his intentions to enter the primaries in Indiana and Florida, and hoped to compete in California in the upcoming months. On March 31, President Johnson made the surprise announcement that he was dropping out of the race and would not seek to be renominated for the presidency.

A collection of McCarthy's campaign materials and speeches was donated to the Special Collection Research Center at the Fenwick Library at George Mason University.

== Post-Johnson campaign ==
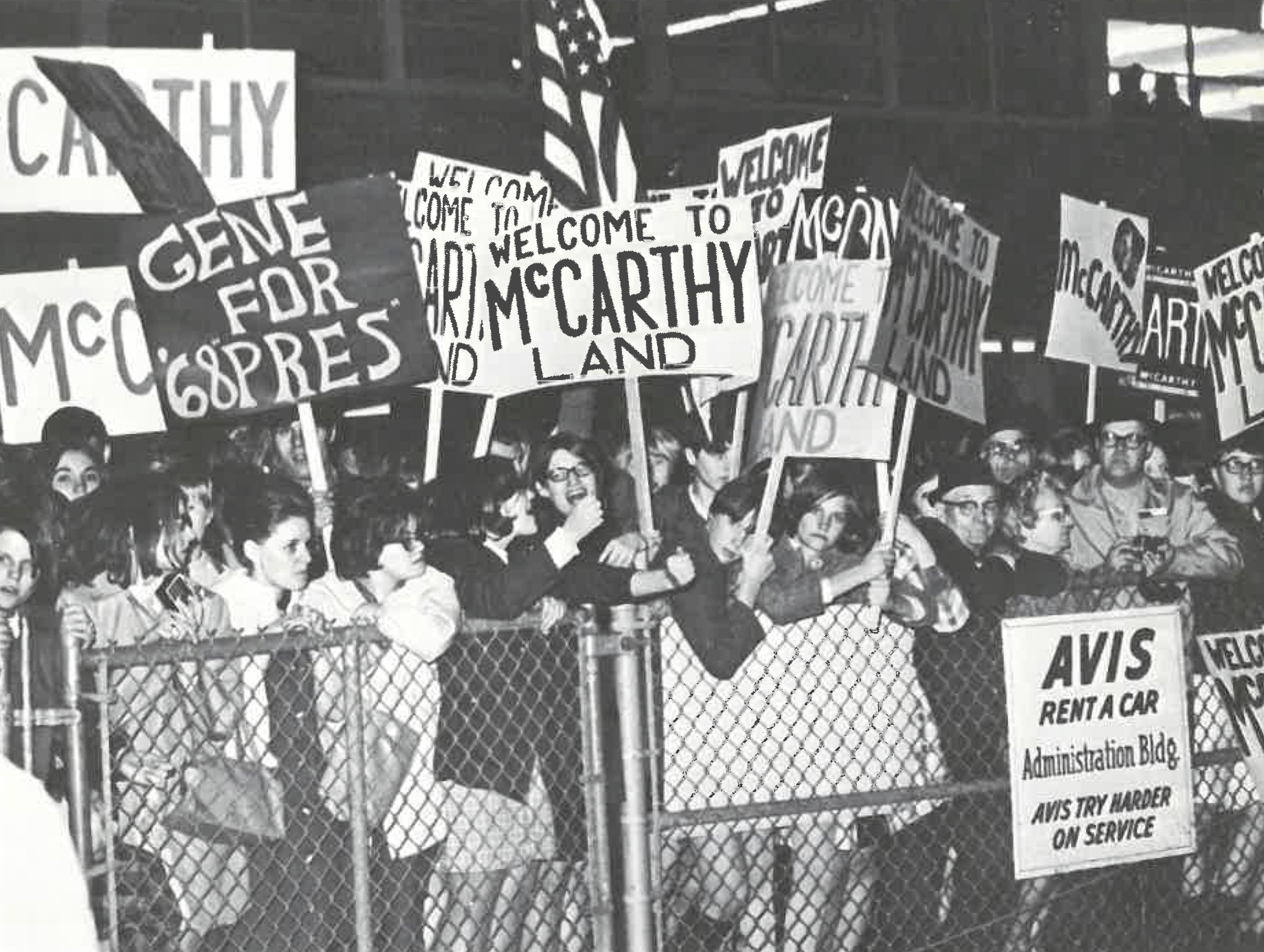
McCarthy supporters at Minnesota State University Moorhead

Since President Johnson had dropped out immediately prior to the Wisconsin Primary, McCarthy easily won although he did not face his new challenger, Robert Kennedy, on the ballot, as Kennedy was ineligible for the ballot because he entered the race following the filing deadline. Polls suggested that McCarthy benefited the most from Johnson's withdrawal, reached 22 percent among the Democratic field, up eleven points, and two behind the still-undeclared Humphrey and fifteen behind Kennedy. He traveled to Pennsylvania later in the month, to prepare for the state's primary in late April. While there, he discussed North Korea's seizing of the USS Pueblo, stating that the United States should "expect once in awhile [sic?] to pay ransom ... if you have ships adjacent to countries that don't respect international law." He clarified that he was not suggesting that the ransom should be paid, and agreed that President Johnson's use of negotiation was correct. He then compared his record of service to Kennedy, articulating that his accomplishments on civil rights paralleled a longer period of time than the senator. On April 23, McCarthy won the Pennsylvania Primary, receiving more votes than Kennedy, whose name did not appear on the ballot but ran as a write-in candidate.

The next month, McCarthy took advantage of Robert Kennedy's decline in the polls, trailing the former frontrunner by two points for second place in the race behind Vice President Humphrey. At the time, polls suggested that McCarthy was more likely than his Democratic rivals to defeat Republican frontrunner Richard Nixon in a head-to-head matchup, leading 40 to 37 percent in a Harris poll. While campaigning in South Bend, Indiana, prior to the state's primary, McCarthy criticized the approach of his two closest Democratic rivals. He stated that there were three kinds of national unity; Humphrey's approach of "run[ning] things together indiscriminately", Kennedy's approach of a "combination of separate interests ... or groups", and his own approach of "call[ing] upon everyone ... to be as fully responsible as [they] can be", which the candidate labeled as the approach for 1968. McCarthy lost in Indiana but received 27 percent of the vote to Kennedy's 42 percent. Four days later, McCarthy received the most votes in Time magazine's national presidential primary. The poll counted votes of over 1 million students in more than 1,200 campuses. Kennedy came in second, trailing by more than 70,000 votes. In regards to the results, McCarthy commented, "We've tested the enemy now, and we know his techniques ... we know his weaknesses." The next day, Kennedy defeated McCarthy in the Nebraska primary but it did not stall his effort. He reaffirmed that he would compete with Kennedy in Oregon, California, New Jersey and South Dakota. He ended the month by defeating Kennedy in the Oregon primary by a margin of 45 to 39 percent. The victory allowed for the media to observe that McCarthy was "back in the race as a major contender", and forced an attention shift to the looming primaries in South Dakota and California, scheduled for the next month.

=== The assassination of Kennedy and its fallout ===
McCarthy and Kennedy vigorously campaigned throughout California in the beginning of June, with the latter announcing he would exit the race if he lost the state's primary. Another primary was going to be held in New Jersey, which adjoined Kennedy's home state of New York, as well. The two candidates each appeared in televised forums, which McCarthy criticized for not being in a debate format. On June 5, Robert Kennedy was shot in Los Angeles after winning both the California and South Dakota primaries. McCarthy immediately canceled his campaign plans and was placed under heavy guard in his hotel. The same night, McCarthy defeated Kennedy in the New Jersey primary. Kennedy died the next day, shifting a large number of his delegates to Humphrey while popular opinion seemed to shift to McCarthy. McCarthy was grief-stricken from the event, and considered dropping out of the race. Following Kennedy's funeral, McCarthy privately met with both Johnson and Humphrey to discuss the future of the Democratic Party. Later in the month, Republican Senator Mark Hatfield of Oregon assessed the Democratic situation, stating that McCarthy did not have a chance and that Humphrey would be the party's nominee.

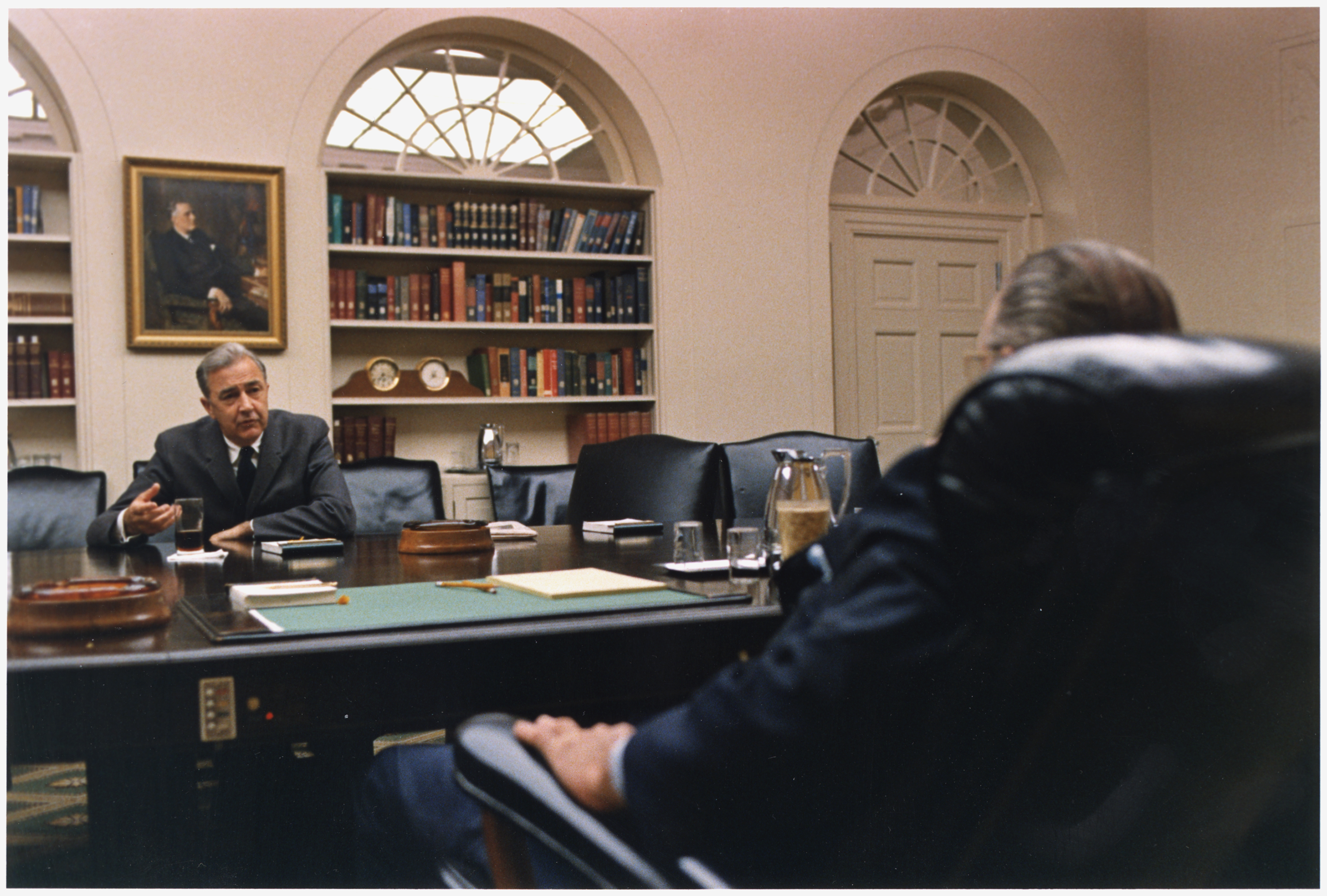
McCarthy (left) meets with Johnson following the funeral of Robert Kennedy

With the primaries wrapped up, McCarthy spent July attempting to woo uncommitted delegates and clarify his positions on the issues. He continued a strong anti-war sentiment, mentioning that he might travel to Paris, France, to discuss peace with the North Vietnamese. Chief negotiators called the potential trip a mistake, and that the talks were too important "to interject partisan politics".

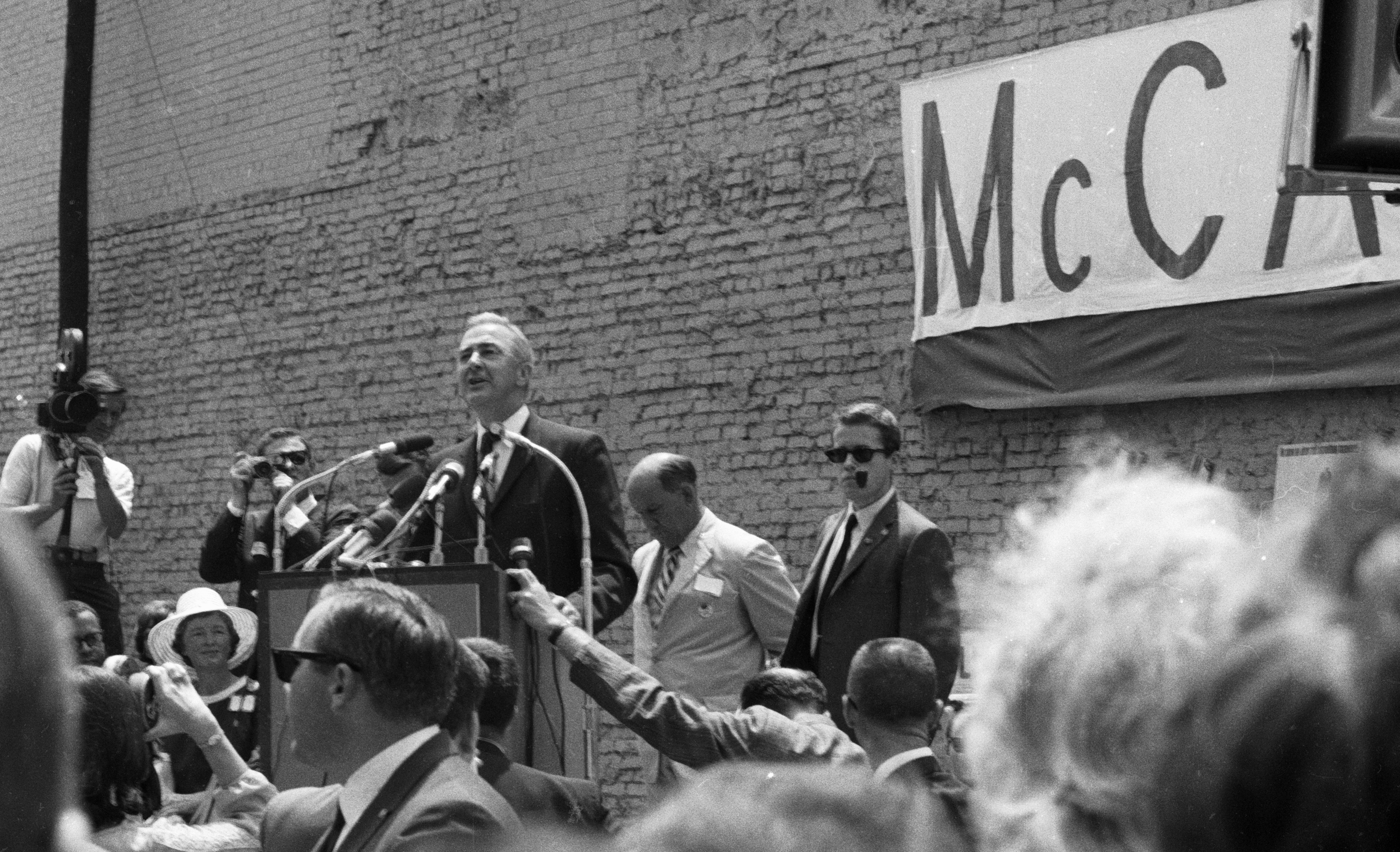
McCarthy speaks at a campaign event in Seattle

Next, the candidate was cited by the emergency committee for gun control chair John Glenn as being one of five presidential candidates that endorsed the group's movement to control firearms. McCarthy argued for a national registration of handguns, and the development of a system to sell mail order guns only to qualified individuals. But argued that the sale of shotguns and rifles, should be left to the discretion of individual states. The next week, he proposed a "war on hunger" to help the millions of Americans he claimed were starving, commenting that "our first concern is the health of each hungry individual." The Department of Agriculture disputed his claims on the matter. Six days later, McCarthy made his way to Georgia, where he sought additional Democratic delegates to counter Vice President Humphrey's strong organization. The previous day, he had visited Pittsburgh and attended a rally that he hoped would gain Pennsylvania's Democratic delegates and the African-American vote. McCarthy challenged Humphrey to a series of debates on an assortment of issues. The Vice-President accepted the invitation but modified the proposal by requesting there be only one debate prior to the Democratic National Convention. As the month ended, and with the Democratic Convention speedily approaching, McCarthy tried to change a few rules of the convention, focusing a great deal on "unit voting" rule, which gave party bosses more control. The tactics were meant to compensate for Humphrey's delegate lead, and were previously used by Dwight Eisenhower in his successful 1952 campaign, while battling Robert A. Taft for the Republican nomination.

=== Democratic Party National Convention ===
McCarthy's plan to gain more delegates was complicated when Senator George McGovern of South Dakota entered the race as the successor to the legacy of Robert Kennedy. The entrance had the effect of splitting the anti-Humphrey vote. Meanwhile, the McCarthy campaign alleged that Democratic National Chairman John Bailey was giving preferential treatment to Humphrey, to the detriment of McCarthy. They asked for the chairman's resignation, but he rejected the claims and argued that the two candidates were receiving "exactly the same treatment in hotel space, amphitheatre space, telephone service, tickets, transportation and every other phase of convention activity." As the eve of the convention dawned, Humphrey appeared to hold a lead over McCarthy among the delegates with McGovern in a distant third, but with many delegates still uncommitted, the three men battled it out. Meanwhile, on the streets of Chicago, anti-war protests raged as 6,000 federal troops and 18,000 Illinois National Guard defended the premises of the convention. Humphrey won the nomination on the first ballot, despite the fact that McCarthy had won a plurality of the primary vote. Riots intensified, and supporters of McCarthy urged the candidate to run a fourth party campaign against Nixon, Humphrey and George Wallace. He announced that he would not run such a campaign, and stepped down while denying an endorsement to Humphrey. At the end of his campaign, McCarthy stated that he "set out to prove ... that the people of this country could be educated and make a decent judgment ... but evidently this is something the politicians were afraid to face up to."

== Aftermath ==
McCarthy's refusal to endorse Humphrey wavered somewhat by October, as the former candidate laid out conditions for the Democratic nominee. These included a shift in his stance on the Vietnam War, a change of the military draft, and a reform of the Democratic machine politics. Humphrey discussed the demands with McCarthy via telephone, and responded that he was "not prone to start meeting conditions", but that he is stating his "own case" as a candidate. At the end of October, McCarthy announced that he would vote for Humphrey, but would go no further than that. Nixon eventually won the election, and McCarthy received 20,721 write-in votes in California. and 2,751 in Arizona, where he was listed as the nominee of the anti-war New Party.

McCarthy also ran for the Democratic nomination in 1972, but soon dropped out. He mounted an independent campaign in 1976 and received over 700,000 votes. He went against his party in 1980 when he gave his public support to Ronald Reagan over Jimmy Carter. McCarthy tried twice again for the Democratic nomination in 1988 and 1992. He died on December 10, 2005, at the age of 89.
