= Dump Johnson movement =

Group of Democratic Party members opposed to President Lyndon B. Johnson's renomination

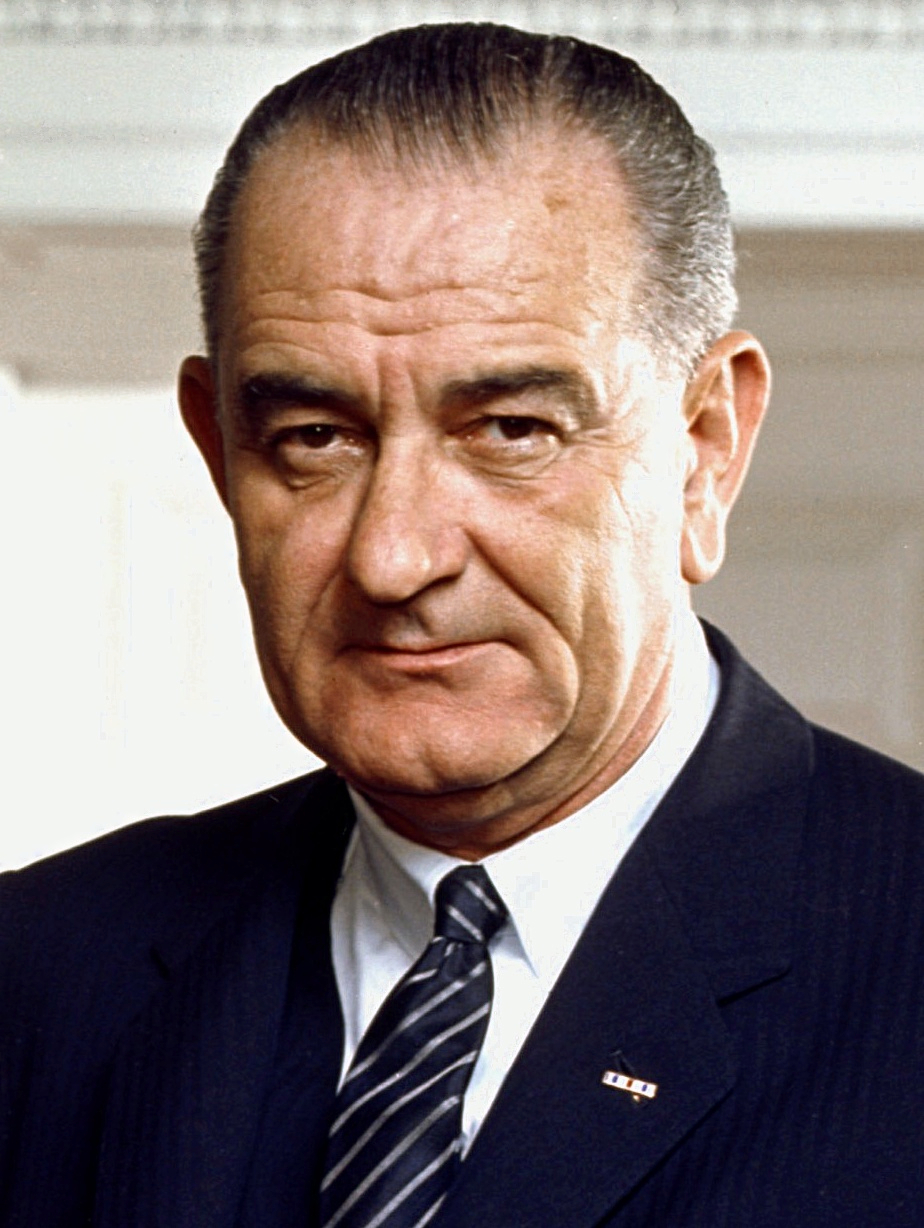
Portrait of President Lyndon B. Johnson, 1964

The Dump Johnson movement was a movement within the Democratic Party to oppose the candidacy of President of the United States Lyndon B. Johnson to become the party's nominee in the 1968 presidential election. Their opposition to Johnson stemmed mainly from their opposition to the Vietnam War, while the movement can be seen as part of an internal battle within the Democratic Party between antiwar liberals, unreconstructed Cold Warriors and moderates.

Within the left wing of the Democratic Party there had been rumbles all during 1967 of challenging Johnson's candidacy. The leading proponents of the Dump Johnson Movement were two opponents of the war, Allard K. Lowenstein and Curtis Gans. Their first choice to be a candidate was Robert F. Kennedy, but the New York Senator declined after a series of meetings in September and October 1967. When he declined, they next turned to California Representative Don Edwards, Idaho Senator Frank Church, retired U.S. Army General James M. Gavin, and South Dakota Senator George S. McGovern, all of whom similarly declined. Economist John Kenneth Galbraith showed willingness to run as the candidate until he was informed his Canadian birth to non-American parents made him ineligible for the office of President of the United States. Finally, in mid-October Lowenstein approached Minnesota Senator Eugene McCarthy and found to his surprise that the Senator was willing. 'Somebody has to raise the flag,' McCarthy remarked. Six days later, in a meeting with Lowenstein and another liberal leader McCarthy made his decision definite. "You guys have been talking about three or four names. I think you can cut the list down to one now."

Johnson's thoughts of running received a fresh blow on March 12, 1968, when McCarthy shocked the country by winning 42 percent of the New Hampshire presidential primary, at which point Kennedy belatedly entered the race, splitting the anti-war opposition between two candidates. Lowenstein and many other antiwar activists remained committed to McCarthy, seeing Kennedy's late entry as opportunistic and divisive.

On Sunday evening, March 31, 1968, at the close of his televised address to the nation on Vietnam, Johnson declared, "I shall not seek, and I will not accept, the nomination of my party for another term as your President". Johnson had withdrawn from the 1968 Democratic candidate race and presidential election.

Between them, McCarthy and Kennedy received more than 5.3 million votes in the Democratic primaries, far more than any other candidates. Kennedy's candidacy ended with his assassination following the California primary on June 5, 1968.
