= Allard K. Lowenstein =

American politician (1929–1980)

Allard Lowenstein
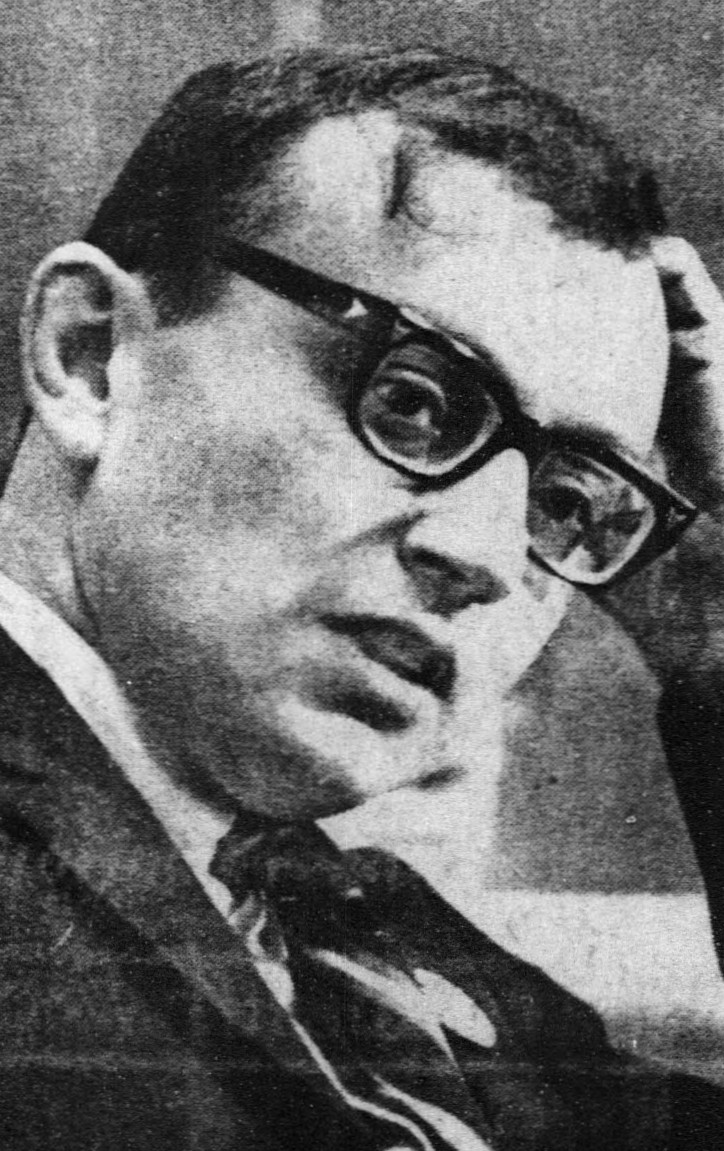
- Lowenstein in 1968

United States Ambassador to the United Nations Commission on Human Rights
- In office February 7, 1977 – August 5, 1977
- President: Jimmy Carter
- Preceded by: Philip E. Hoffman
- Succeeded by: Edward Mezvinsky

Member of the U.S. House of Representatives from New York's 5th district
- In office January 3, 1969 – January 3, 1971
- Preceded by: Herbert Tenzer
- Succeeded by: Norman F. Lent

Personal details
- Born: Allard Kenneth Lowenstein; January 16, 1929 Newark, New Jersey, U.S.
- Died: March 14, 1980 (aged 51) New York City, New York, U.S.
- Cause of death: Assassination by gunshot
- Party: Democratic
- Spouse: Jennifer Lyman
- Children: 3
- Education: University of North Carolina, Chapel Hill (BA); Yale University (LLB)

Allard Kenneth Lowenstein (January 16, 1929 – March 14, 1980) was an American Democratic politician who served as the U.S. representative for the 5th congressional district in Nassau County, New York, for one term from 1969 to 1971.

He was murdered on March 14, 1980 in his Manhattan law office.

== Early life and start of career ==
Allard Kenneth Lowenstein was born on January 16, 1929 in Newark, New Jersey, the son of Lithuanian Jewish immigrants Gabriel Lowenstein [Löwenstein] and Augusta Goldberg Lowenstein. Lowenstein had two older brothers, Bert and Larry. His mother died from breast cancer when he was very young, and his father remarried soon after. Lowenstein was a graduate of the Horace Mann School in New York City and of the University of North Carolina. As an undergraduate, he was president of the National Student Association and the Dialectic Society. Lowenstein received a J.D. from Yale Law School in 1954.

After law school, Lowenstein served in the U.S. Army from 1954 to 1956, then became a college professor and administrator, holding posts at Stanford University, North Carolina State University, and City College of New York.

== Political activism ==
=== Early public service ===
In 1949 Lowenstein worked as a special assistant on the staff of Senator Frank Porter Graham and was a foreign policy assistant on Senator Hubert H. Humphrey's staff in 1959. In the 1960s Lowenstein spent time in Mississippi as part of the Freedom Summer, and an interview of Lowenstein was featured in episode 5 of the Civil Rights Movement documentary Eyes on the Prize.

=== South Africa and national politics ===
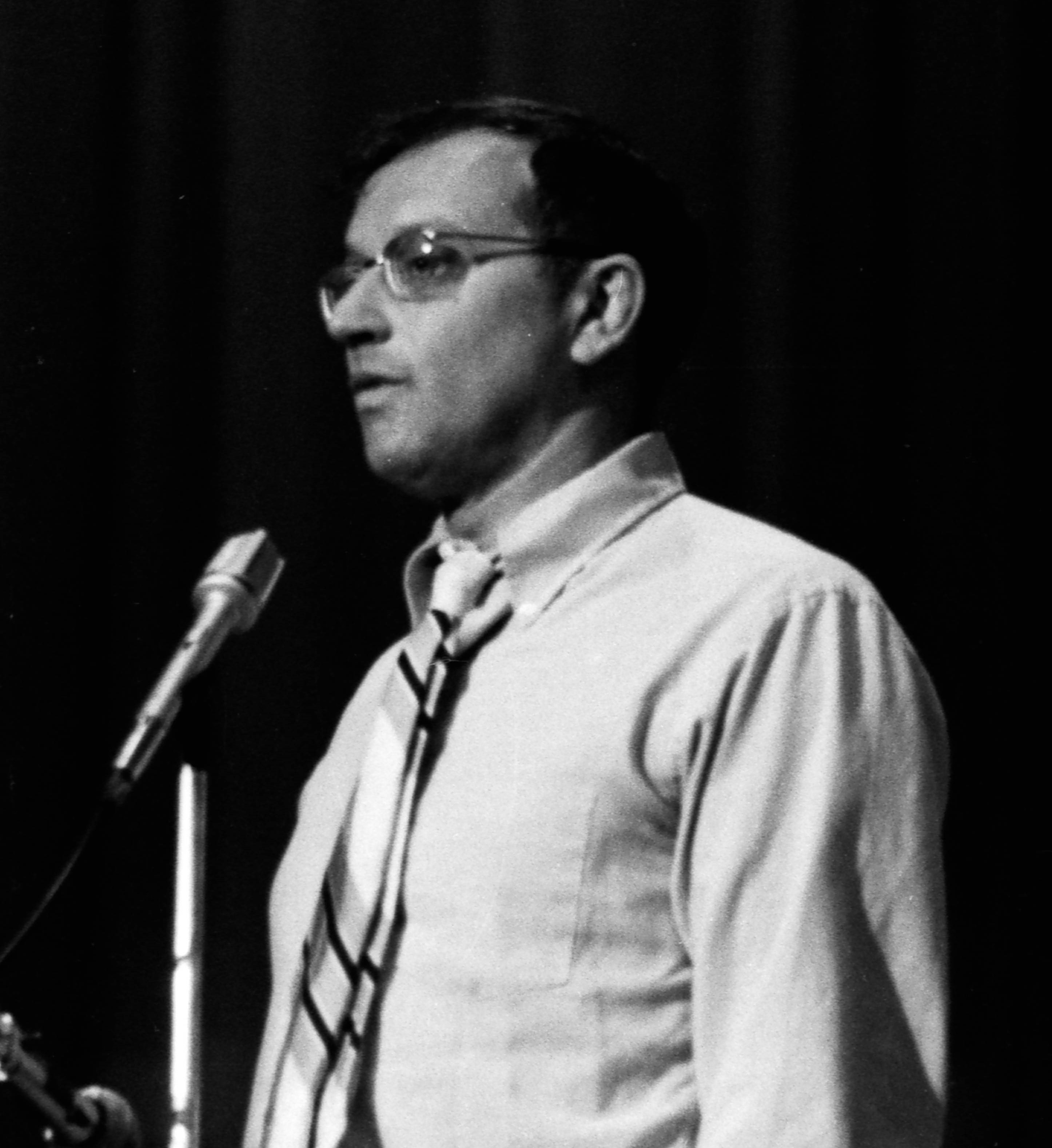
Allard Lowenstein at congressional race fundraiser, August 29, 1976

In 1959, Lowenstein made a clandestine tour of South-West Africa, now Namibia. While he was there, he collected testimony against the South African-controlled government (South-West Africa was a United Nations Trust Territory). After his return, he spent a year promoting his findings to various student organizations and then wrote a book, A Brutal Mandate, with an introduction by Eleanor Roosevelt, with whom he had worked in 1957 at the American Association for the United Nations.

In 1960 Lowenstein was a delegate to the Democratic National Convention.

In 1964, he attended the 1964 Republican National Convention with his close friend and Congressional colleague Donald Rumsfeld.

In 1966 he helped Senator Robert F. Kennedy in writing his famous Day of Affirmation Address, given to the National Union of South African Students at the University of Cape Town.

=== "Dump Johnson" movement and 1968 presidential race ===
Along with Curtis Gans in 1967, and later that fall joined by Wisconsin's Midge Miller, Lowenstein started the "Dump Johnson" movement, approaching Senators Robert F. Kennedy and, at Kennedy's suggestion, George McGovern about challenging President Johnson in the 1968 Democratic primaries. When Kennedy and McGovern both declined, Lowenstein, a delegate to the Democratic National Convention, recruited and worked for Eugene McCarthy, to whose candidacy he remained loyal, even after Kennedy's late entry into the race (before Johnson bowed out). Johnson's withdrawal from the presidential nomination process has been attributed to the impact of the "Dump Johnson" movement, culminating in the historical precedent of McCarthy's strong showing against Johnson in the New Hampshire primary.

=== Election to Congress ===
Lowenstein was elected to Congress on Long Island, New York, in 1968 but was defeated in a modified district in 1970 by New York State Senator Norman F. Lent by 9,300 votes, effectively gerrymandered out of office by the Republican-controlled state legislature, which determined the district's boundaries. Long Island's generally liberal Five Towns region had been removed from the district, and the far more conservative Massapequa added. Lowenstein captured 46% of the vote in the new district.

=== ADA leadership, "Dump Nixon" movement and Nixon Enemies List ===
The 1970 election was viewed nationwide as a referendum on President Richard Nixon's conduct of the Vietnam War. In 1971, Lowenstein became head of the Americans for Democratic Action and spearheaded the "Dump Nixon" movement, earning himself the number 7 spot on Nixon's Enemies List.

=== Campaigns for Congress ===
In 1972, Lowenstein ran unsuccessfully for Congress in Brooklyn against Congressman John J. Rooney, a conservative Democrat supported by the party "machine," in the Democratic primary. After Rooney's victory was challenged and the election recalled due to allegations of fraud, Rooney narrowly won the rescheduled primary, but Lowenstein continued in the race on the Liberal Party line, finishing with 28% of the vote.

After an abortive 1974 U.S. Senate bid, Lowenstein unsuccessfully challenged incumbent Republican Congressman John Wydler in a largely Republican district in Long Island in 1974 and 1976, receiving crucial support and endorsements from some local conservative Republicans as well as conservative William F. Buckley, Jr. In 1974, he was defeated by Wydler, 58-42 percent.

=== Robert F. Kennedy assassination ===
External audio
- Allard Lowenstein speaking at UCLA (Apr. 7, 1969)

Lowenstein was one of the first public figures to cast doubt upon the official account of the June 6, 1968, assassination of Senator Robert F. Kennedy. Lowenstein made a one-hour appearance on the PBS television show Firing Line in 1975, where he was interviewed by William F. Buckley Jr., in which he stated that he did not believe that Sirhan Sirhan alone had shot Kennedy.

=== United Nations appointment and final campaign for Congress ===
President Carter appointed Lowenstein as United States Representative to the United Nations Commission on Human Rights, and thus head of the United States delegation to the thirty-third regular annual session of the United Nations Commission on Human Rights in Geneva, Switzerland, in 1977. Lowenstein served with the rank of ambassador from August 1977 to June 1978 in the capacity of alternate United States Representative for Special Political Affairs to the United Nations.

In 1978 he resigned his U.N. post to run for Congress in Manhattan's "Silk Stocking District", narrowly losing the Democratic primary to Carter Burden, who in turn lost the general election to Republican S. William Green.

== Associations with conservatives ==
Lowenstein was a close friend of conservative commentator William F. Buckley, Jr., who featured Lowenstein on numerous Firing Line programs, publicly endorsed his candidacies for U.S. Congress, and delivered a eulogy at his funeral.

Lowenstein reportedly was Republican Donald Rumsfeld's "best friend in Congress" during Lowenstein's term of office, the two having become good friends while serving as Congressional aides in the late 1950s. Despite their party and ideological differences, Rumsfeld joined Lowenstein on the victory platform upon Lowenstein's election to Congress in 1968. In 1970, Rumsfeld publicly defended Lowenstein against his Republican opponent's attacks, only to recant and endorse the opponent, Norman Lent, under pressure from the Nassau County (Long Island) Republican organization and Nixon White House. Rumsfeld's public reversal contributed to Lowenstein's reelection defeat and the end of their friendship.

Lowenstein's subsequent campaigns for Congress from Long Island against Republican incumbent John Wydler in a largely Republican district were significantly aided by active, public support from several local conservative Republicans.

== Death ==
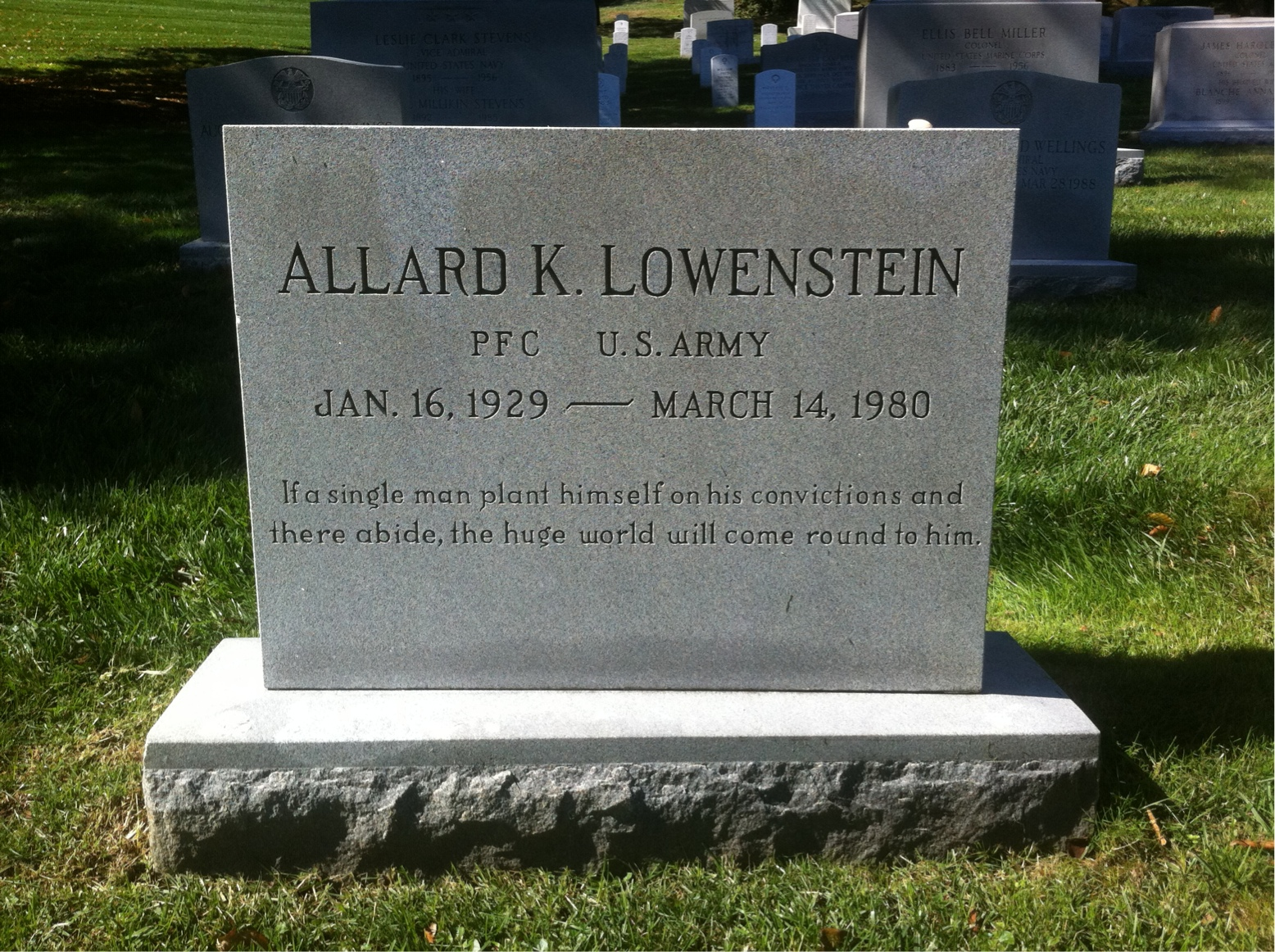
Lowenstein's grave at Arlington National Cemetery

On March 14, 1980, Lowenstein was shot in his Manhattan office from a Llama .380-caliber semi-automatic pistol by Dennis Sweeney, who was mentally ill and believed that Lowenstein was plotting against him. Sweeney then calmly waited for the police to arrive.

Sweeney was found not guilty by reason of insanity and committed to full-time psychiatric treatment for schizophrenia. In 2000, a judge found that Sweeney was no longer a danger to society and granted him a conditional release.

== Personal life ==
Lowenstein was married to Jennifer Lowenstein (née Lyman, now Littlefield) from 1966 to 1977, when they divorced, and the two had three children: Frank Graham, Thomas Kennedy, and Katharine Eleanor.

While he dated women and later married one, Lowenstein's biographer William Chafe asserts that he was allegedly gay. Chafe notes that toward the end of his life he became active in gay rights causes. Chafe speculates that he was on the verge of focusing on this issue and coming out, when he was killed. Lowenstein's alleged homosexuality was later confirmed by many friends and associates interviewed by an oral history project.

Katharine Lowenstein is a victims rights attorney and juvenile justice advocate. Thomas Lowenstein founded and directs the New Orleans Journalism Project, and has worked with the New Orleans Innocence Project. He is author of "The Trials of Walter Ogrod." Frank Lowenstein was the U.S. Special Envoy for Israeli-Palestinian Negotiations and Senior Advisor to the U.S. Secretary of State during the presidency of Barack Obama.

In the early 1960s, he briefly served as dean of Stern Hall, then a men's dormitory at Stanford University, during which time he met and befriended undergraduate students including David Harris and Dennis Sweeney.

== Honors and memorials ==
Hofstra University established the Allard K. Lowenstein Civil Rights Scholarship in 2007.

Yale Law School also has several programs named in honor of Lowenstein. The Allard K. Lowenstein International Human Rights Project was founded in 1981 shortly after Lowenstein's death to honor his contributions in the field of human rights and provide law students with a vehicle to continue his work. The Lowenstein Human Rights Clinic, an outgrowth of the Project, is a clinical course in which law students participate in legal and advocacy research and writing projects for academic credit.

Lowenstein's papers are held as a special collection of the Long Beach Public Library and offer much material relative to his activities and his times. The Long Beach, New York Public Library is also named after Lowenstein (since the 1980s).

In 1980, Lowenstein received the Award for Greatest Public Service Benefiting the Disadvantaged, an award given out annually by Jefferson Awards.

In 1980 singer/songwriter Harry Chapin, a personal friend of Lowenstein, wrote his song "Remember When the Music" after hearing the news of Lowenstein's death. On his posthumous live album The Bottom Line Encore Collection, Chapin dedicated the song to Lowenstein and John Lennon, who also died in 1980.

An area adjacent to the United Nations headquarters in New York City is named Allard K. Lowenstein Square.

In 1983, the documentary film Citizen: The Political Life of Allard K. Lowenstein was produced by Brogan De Paor, Mike Farrell and Julie Thompson and directed by Thompson. It was broadcast on PBS Television in 1984.

== In popular culture ==
Lowenstein was portrayed by Brent Spiner in the 1984 television miniseries Robert Kennedy and His Times, based on the book by Arthur M. Schlesinger, Jr.

== See also ==
- List of assassinated American politicians

== Notes ==
U.S. House of Representatives
Preceded by Herbert Tenzer	Member of the U.S. House of Representatives from New York's 5th congressional district 1969–1971	Succeeded by Norman F. Lent
