= Curtis Gans =

American activist and writer (1937-2015)

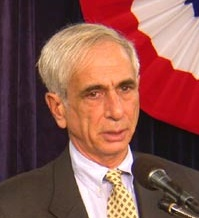
- Curtis Gans speaking at a 2004 Washington Foreign Press Center Briefing on "The Upsurge in Voter Registration and Expectations for Turnout in the 2004 Elections.
- Born: Curtis Bernard Gans; June 17, 1937; Brooklyn, New York
- Died: March 15, 2015 (aged 77); Frederick, Maryland
- Occupations: Co-founder, Director
- Organization: Center for the Study of the American Electorate
- Known for: Expertise: voter turnout and participation
- Website: Gans' page at CDEM

Curtis Bernard Gans (June 17, 1937 – March 15, 2015) was an American activist, writer, and expert on American voting patterns.

With Allard K. Lowenstein, Gans in 1967 started and headed the Dump Johnson movement. Based on opposition to the Vietnam War, the movement, which was considered quixotic at first, grew strong and was instrumental in setting in motion events which eventually persuaded president Lyndon Johnson that continuing his campaign to be re-nominated for the presidency by his party would be difficult and divisive and uncertain of success. Johnson withdrew his candidacy, an unusual event in American politics for a sitting president who had desired re-election.

Gans studied turnout and voting patterns for more than three decades. He co-founded and was director of the Center for the Study of the American Electorate, formerly housed at American University in Washington, D. C. Gans was commonly sought out by major American publications as an expert on voting patterns and was sometimes called on by the US State Department's Foreign Press Center to brief foreign reporters during the runup to American elections.

Additionally, he served as a consultant to the Woodrow Wilson Center for International Scholars, the National Committee for an Effective Congress, and managed a number of political campaigns. In 2015, he died at the age of 77 of lung cancer.

== Bibliography ==
=== Books ===
- Gans, Curtis (2010). Voter Turnout in the United States, 1788-2009. CQ Press. ISBN 978-1604265958.

=== Selected articles ===
- Curtis Gans (July–August 2000). "Table for One, Please: America's disintegrating democracy". Washington Monthly. Archived from the original on October 19, 2013.
- Curtis Gans (December 26, 2011). "A Proposed Solution to Voter ID Controversy". Huffington Post.
- Curtis Gans (October 23, 2012). "Column: Electoral College should be fixed, not dumped". USA Today.
- Curtis Gans (November 5, 2012). "Why the Citizens Who Can Should Vote and Why 96 Million Citizens May Not". Huffington Post.
- Curtis Gans (October 18, 2013). "Why Only Republicans Can Save Us From the Tea Party". Ten Miles Square. Washington Monthly. Archived from the original on October 19, 2013.
