= Eugene McCarthy =

American politician (1916–2005)

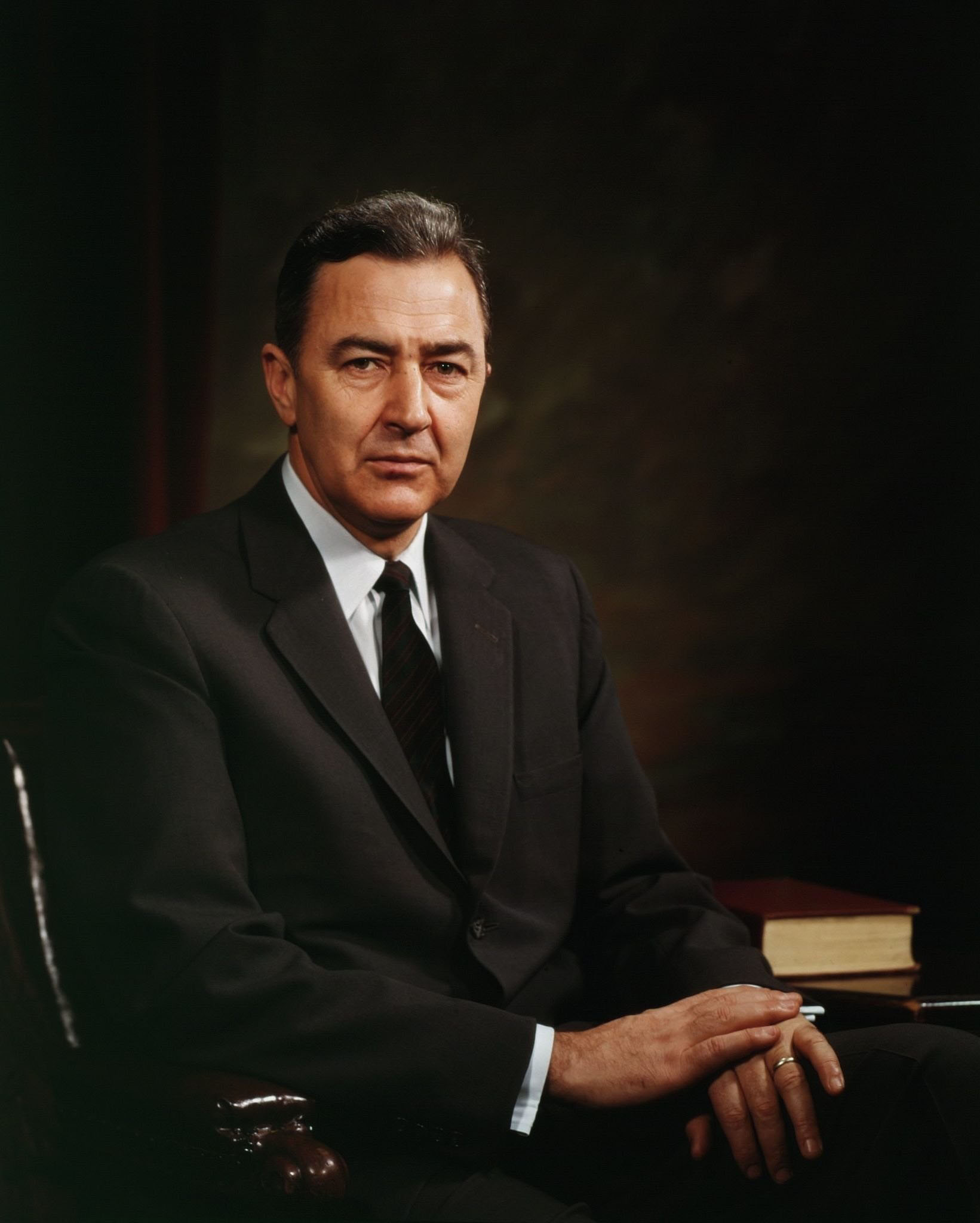
- 1964 portrait

United States Senator from Minnesota
- In office January 3, 1959 – January 3, 1971
- Preceded by: Edward John Thye
- Succeeded by: Hubert Humphrey

Member of the U.S. House of Representatives from Minnesota's 4th district
- In office January 3, 1949 – January 3, 1959
- Preceded by: Edward Devitt
- Succeeded by: Joseph Karth

Personal details
- Born: Eugene Joseph McCarthy; March 29, 1916 Watkins, Minnesota, U.S.
- Died: December 10, 2005 (aged 89) Washington, D.C., U.S.
- Party: Democratic (DFL)
- Other political affiliations: Independent (1972–1976)
- Spouse: Abigail Quigley (m. 1945; sep. 1969)
- Children: 5
- Education: Saint John's University (BA); University of Minnesota (MA)

Military service
- Allegiance: United States
- Branch/service: United States Army
- Unit: Army Military Intelligence Corps
- Battles/wars: World War II

Eugene Joseph McCarthy (March 29, 1916 – December 10, 2005) was an American politician, writer, and academic who represented Minnesota in both houses of the United States Congress for over 22 years, first in the U.S. House of Representatives from 1949 to 1959, then in the U.S. Senate from 1959 to 1971. A member of the Minnesota Democratic–Farmer–Labor Party (DFL), Minnesota's affiliate of the Democratic Party, McCarthy sought the party's presidential nomination in the 1968 presidential election, challenging incumbent President Lyndon B. Johnson on an anti–Vietnam War platform. He ran for president four more times.

Born in Watkins, Minnesota, McCarthy became an economics professor after earning a graduate degree from the University of Minnesota. He served as a code breaker for the United States Department of War during World War II. McCarthy became a member of the Minnesota Democratic–Farmer–Labor Party (DFL) and in 1948 he was elected to the House of Representatives from Minnesota's 4th congressional district, where he served until being elected to the U.S. Senate in 1958. McCarthy was a prominent supporter of Adlai Stevenson II for the Democratic presidential nomination in 1960, and was himself a candidate for the Democratic vice-presidential nomination in 1964. He co-sponsored the Immigration and Nationality Act of 1965, though he later expressed regret about its impact and became a member of the Federation for American Immigration Reform.

As the 1960s progressed, McCarthy emerged as a prominent opponent of Johnson's handling of the Vietnam War. After Robert F. Kennedy declined the request of a group of antiwar Democrats to challenge Johnson in the 1968 Democratic primaries, McCarthy entered the race on an antiwar platform. Though he was initially given little chance of winning, the Tet Offensive galvanized opposition to the war, and McCarthy finished in a strong second place in the New Hampshire primary. After that, Kennedy entered the race, and Johnson announced that he would not seek reelection. McCarthy and Kennedy each won several primary contests. The race was upended in June 1968 when Kennedy was assassinated. McCarthy won a plurality of the popular vote and delegate count in the primaries, but the rules did not bind delegates to their primary results.

After Kennedy's assassination, his delegates became uncommitted, with most ultimately backing Vice President Hubert Humphrey, who had not actively campaigned in the primaries. He had entered the primaries in April 1968 and was the preferred candidate of President Johnson. This gave Humphrey the majority needed to secure the Democratic nomination at the 1968 Democratic National Convention. McCarthy did not seek reelection in the 1970 Senate election. He sought the Democratic presidential nomination in 1972 but fared poorly. He ran in more races after that but was never elected to another office. He ran as an independent in the 1976 presidential election and won 0.9% of the popular vote. He was a plaintiff in the landmark campaign finance case Buckley v. Valeo and supported Ronald Reagan in the 1980 presidential election. McCarthy died of complications from Parkinson's disease at age 89 in December 2005, in a retirement home in Georgetown, Washington, D.C.

== Early life and education ==
McCarthy was born in Watkins, Minnesota. He was the son of a deeply religious Catholic woman of German ancestry, Anna Baden McCarthy, and a strong-willed man of Irish descent, Michael John McCarthy Jr., a postmaster and cattle buyer.

McCarthy grew up in Watkins with his parents and three siblings. He attended St. Anthony's Catholic School in Watkins, and spent hours reading his aunt's Harvard Classics. He was influenced by the monks at nearby St. John's Abbey and University in Collegeville, Minnesota, and attended school there, at Saint John's Preparatory School, from which he graduated in 1932. He also went to college at Saint John's University, graduating in 1935. McCarthy earned his master's degree from the University of Minnesota in 1939. He taught in public schools in Minnesota and North Dakota from 1935 to 1940, when he became a professor of economics and education at St. John's, working there from 1940 to 1943.

While at St. John's, he coached the hockey team for one season.

In 1943, considering the contemplative life of a monk, he became a Benedictine novice at Saint John's Abbey. After nine months as a monk he left the monastery, causing a fellow novice to say, "It was like losing a 20-game winner". He enlisted in the Army, serving as a code breaker for the Military Intelligence Division of the War Department in Washington, D.C. in 1944. He was then an instructor in sociology and economics at the College of St. Thomas in St. Paul, Minnesota, from 1946 to 1949.

== U.S. House of Representatives (1949–1959) ==
McCarthy became a member of the Minnesota Democratic–Farmer–Labor Party. In 1948 he was elected to the United States House of Representatives with labor and Catholic support, representing Minnesota's 4th congressional district until 1959. He became the leader of young liberals, predominately from the Midwest, called "McCarthy's Marauders".

In 1952 he engaged Wisconsin Senator Joseph McCarthy (no relation) in a nationally televised debate in which he parodied the Senator's arguments to "prove" that General Douglas MacArthur had been a communist pawn. In 1958 he was elected to the U.S. Senate.

== U.S. Senate (1959–1971) ==
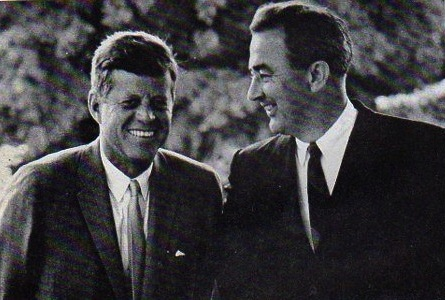
McCarthy with President John F. Kennedy

He served as a member of (among other committees) the powerful Senate Foreign Relations Committee. McCarthy became known to a larger audience in 1960 when he supported twice-defeated presidential candidate Adlai Stevenson for the Democratic nomination. He pleaded during his speech nominating Stevenson, "Do not reject this man who made us all proud to be called Democrats!" He joked about his own merits as a candidate, "I'm twice as liberal as Hubert Humphrey, twice as intelligent as Stuart Symington, and twice as Catholic as Jack Kennedy." He was considered as a possible running mate for Lyndon Johnson in 1964, only to see fellow Minnesota Senator Humphrey chosen for that position.

McCarthy voted in favor of the Civil Rights Act of 1960, the 24th Amendment to the U.S. Constitution, the Civil Rights Act of 1964, the Voting Rights Act of 1965, and the Medicare program. He did not vote on the Civil Rights Act of 1968 or on the confirmation of Thurgood Marshall to the U.S. Supreme Court.

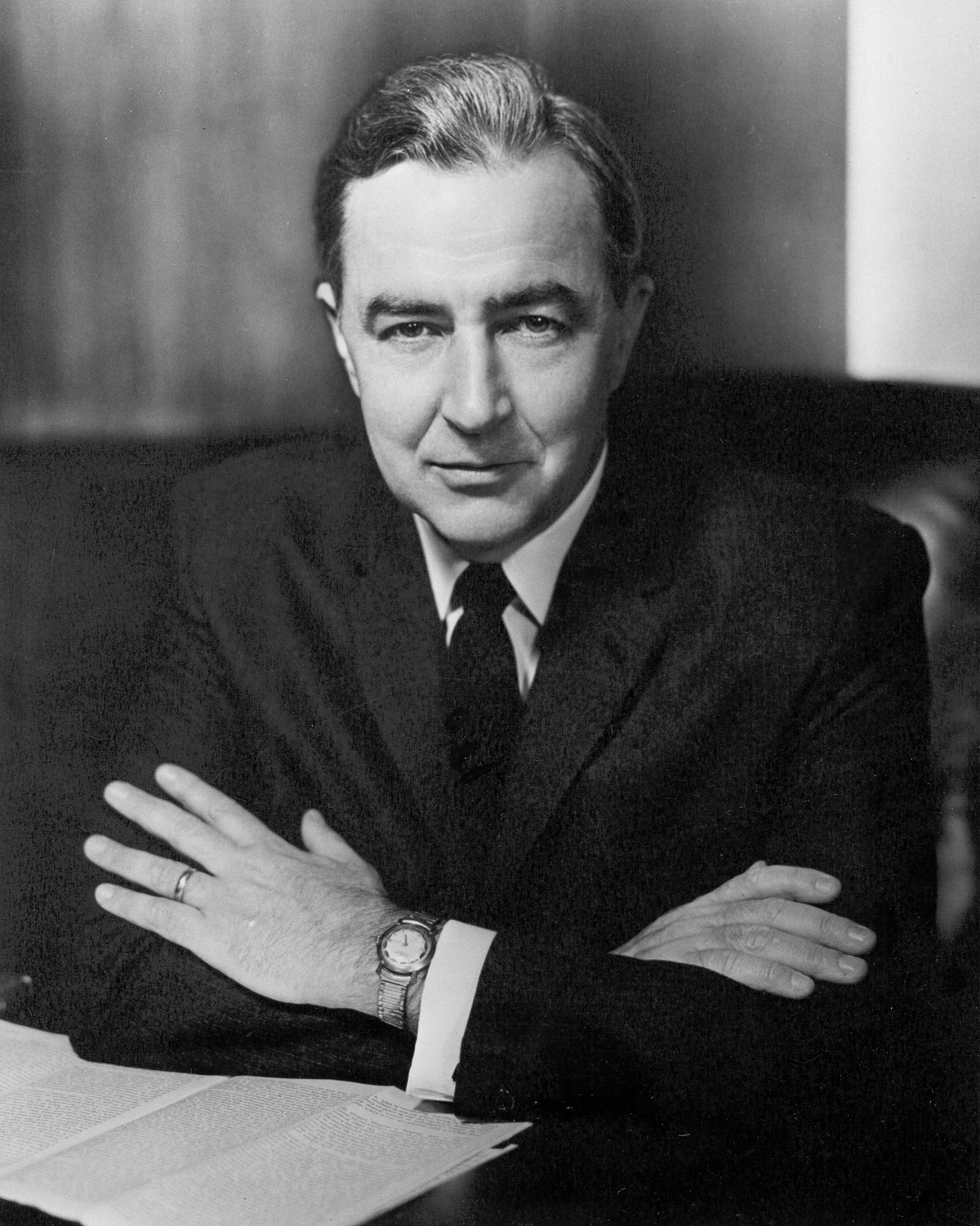
Portrait of McCarthy, c. 1965

Along with Ted Kennedy, McCarthy was one of the original co-sponsors of the Immigration Act of 1965. He later regretted this, noting that "unrecognized by virtually all of the bill's supporters were provisions which would eventually lead to unprecedented growth in numbers and the transfer of policy control from the elected representatives of the American people to individuals wishing to bring relatives to this country". He became a member of the Federation for American Immigration Reform's board of advisors.

McCarthy met with Marxist-Leninist revolutionary Che Guevara in New York City in 1964 to discuss repairing relations between the US and Cuba. They met in journalist Lisa Howard's apartment on Park Avenue in Manhattan. The 2008 film Che: Part One depicts this event.

== 1968 presidential campaign ==
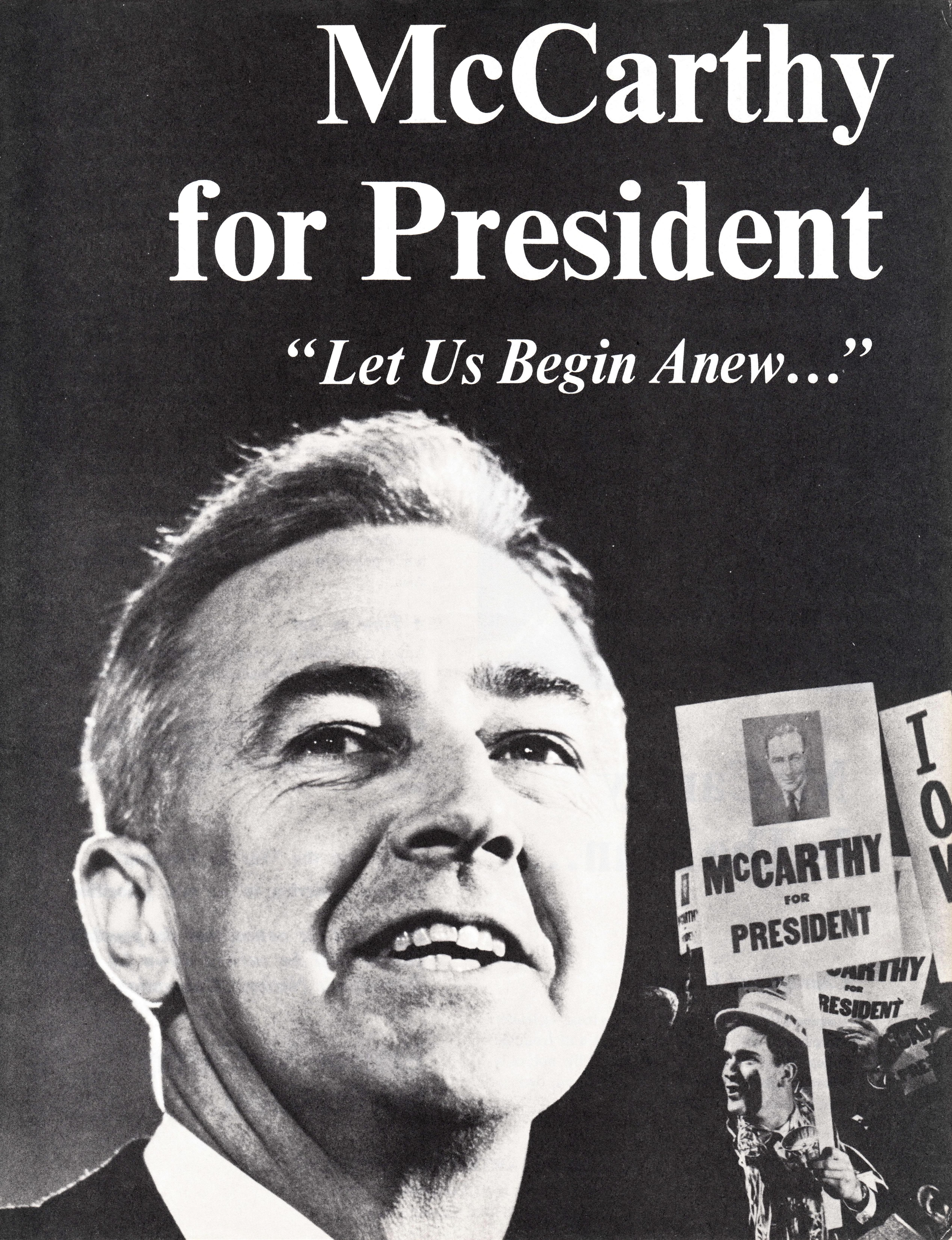
Campaign poster

=== McCarthy challenges Johnson ===
In 1968, Allard K. Lowenstein and his anti-Vietnam War Dump Johnson movement recruited McCarthy to run against incumbent President Lyndon B. Johnson. Reportedly, Lowenstein first attempted to recruit Senator Robert F. Kennedy, who declined to run, then Senator George McGovern, who also declined (Kennedy eventually decided to run after the primary on March 16, 1968, and McGovern also later briefly entered the race). McCarthy entered and almost defeated Johnson in the New Hampshire primary, with the intention of influencing the federal government—then controlled by Democrats—to curtail its involvement in the Vietnam War. A number of antiwar college students and other activists from around the country traveled to New Hampshire to support McCarthy's campaign. Some antiwar students who had the long-haired, counterculture appearance of hippies chose to cut their long hair and shave off their beards in order to campaign for McCarthy door-to-door, a phenomenon that led to the informal slogan "Get clean for Gene".

McCarthy's decision to run arose partly as an outcome of Oregon Senator Wayne Morse's opposition to the war. Morse was one of two senators to vote against the Gulf of Tonkin Resolution of August 1964. He gave speeches denouncing the war before it had entered most Americans' awareness. Thereafter, several politically active Oregon Democrats asked Kennedy to run as an antiwar candidate. McCarthy also encouraged Kennedy to run. After Kennedy refused, the group asked McCarthy to run, and he responded favorably. After Kennedy entered the race and Johnson withdrew, however, McCarthy shifted his focus toward Kennedy.

McCarthy declared his candidacy on November 30, 1967, saying, "I am concerned that the Administration seems to have set no limit to the price it is willing to pay for a military victory." Political experts and the news media dismissed his candidacy, and he was given little chance of making any impact against Johnson in the primaries. But public perception of him changed following the Tet Offensive (January 30 – February 23, 1968), the aftermath of which saw many Democrats grow disillusioned with the war, and quite a few interested in an alternative to Johnson. McCarthy said, "My decision to challenge the President's position and the administration's position has been strengthened by recent announcements out of the administration. The evident intention to escalate and to intensify the war in Vietnam, and on the other hand, the absence of any positive indication or suggestion for a compromise or for a negotiated political settlement."

On December 3, 1967, McCarthy addressed the Conference of Concerned Democrats in Chicago, accusing the Johnson administration of ignoring and bungling opportunities for bringing the war to a conclusion. Eight days later it was reported that he had suggested abandoning some areas of South Vietnam to the Viet Cong. On February 17, 1968, it was reported that McCarthy's campaign had raised only a quarter of the funds it had hoped to raise nationally.

As his volunteers (led by youth coordinator Sam Brown) went door to door in New Hampshire, and as the media began paying more serious attention to the senator, McCarthy began to rise in the polls. When he received 42% of the vote to Johnson's 49% in the March 12 New Hampshire primary (and 20 of New Hampshire's 24 delegates to the Democratic convention), it became clear that there was deep division among Democrats about the war. Johnson had become inextricably defined by Vietnam, and this demonstration of divided support within his party meant his reelection (only four years after winning the highest percentage of the popular vote in modern history) seemed unlikely. The folk trio Peter, Paul and Mary released a record "Eugene McCarthy For President (If You Love Your Country)", endorsing McCarthy, who they said had stood alone against Johnson over "more timid men" now echoing him.

=== Kennedy enters the race ===
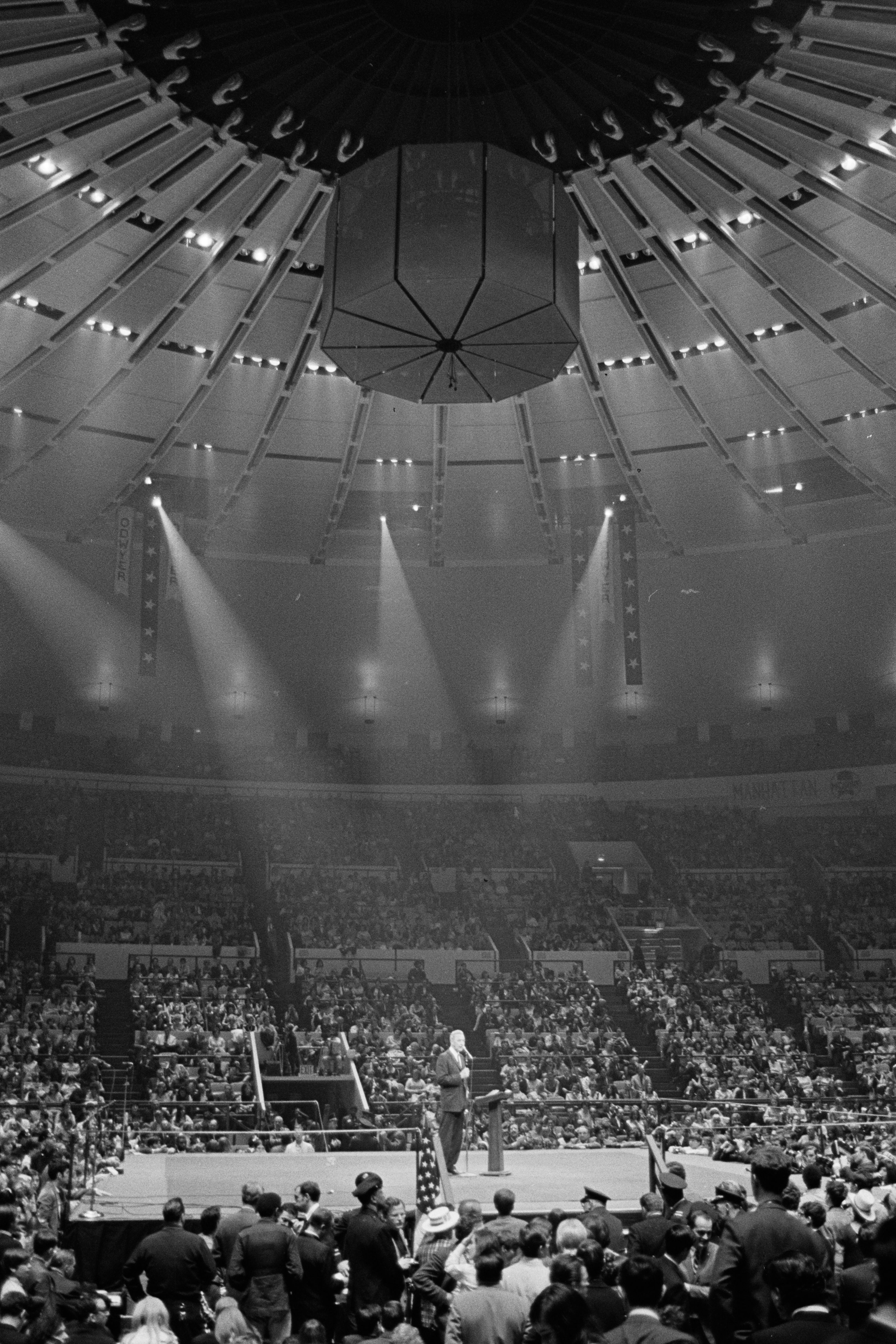
McCarthy speaks at a campaign rally at Madison Square Garden, May 19, 1968

On March 16, Robert F. Kennedy announced that he would run; many Democrats saw Kennedy as a stronger candidate than McCarthy. On March 31, Johnson surprised the world by announcing that he would not seek reelection. After that, McCarthy won in Wisconsin, where the Kennedy campaign was still getting organized. McCarthy also won in Oregon against a well-organized Kennedy effort; it was considered his first official victory over Kennedy.

McCarthy styled himself as a clean politician, but criticized his opponents. Known for his wit, when asked if Michigan Governor George Romney's comment that Romney had been "brainwashed" about the Vietnam War had ended Romney's presidential hopes, McCarthy remarked, "Well... no, not really. Anyway, I think in that case a light rinse would have been sufficient." He mocked Kennedy and his supporters. A major gaffe occurred in Oregon, when McCarthy called Kennedy supporters "less intelligent" than his own and belittled Indiana (which had by then gone for Kennedy) for lacking a poet of the stature of Robert Lowell—a friend of McCarthy's who often traveled with him. In May, Kennedy attacked McCarthy's civil rights record.

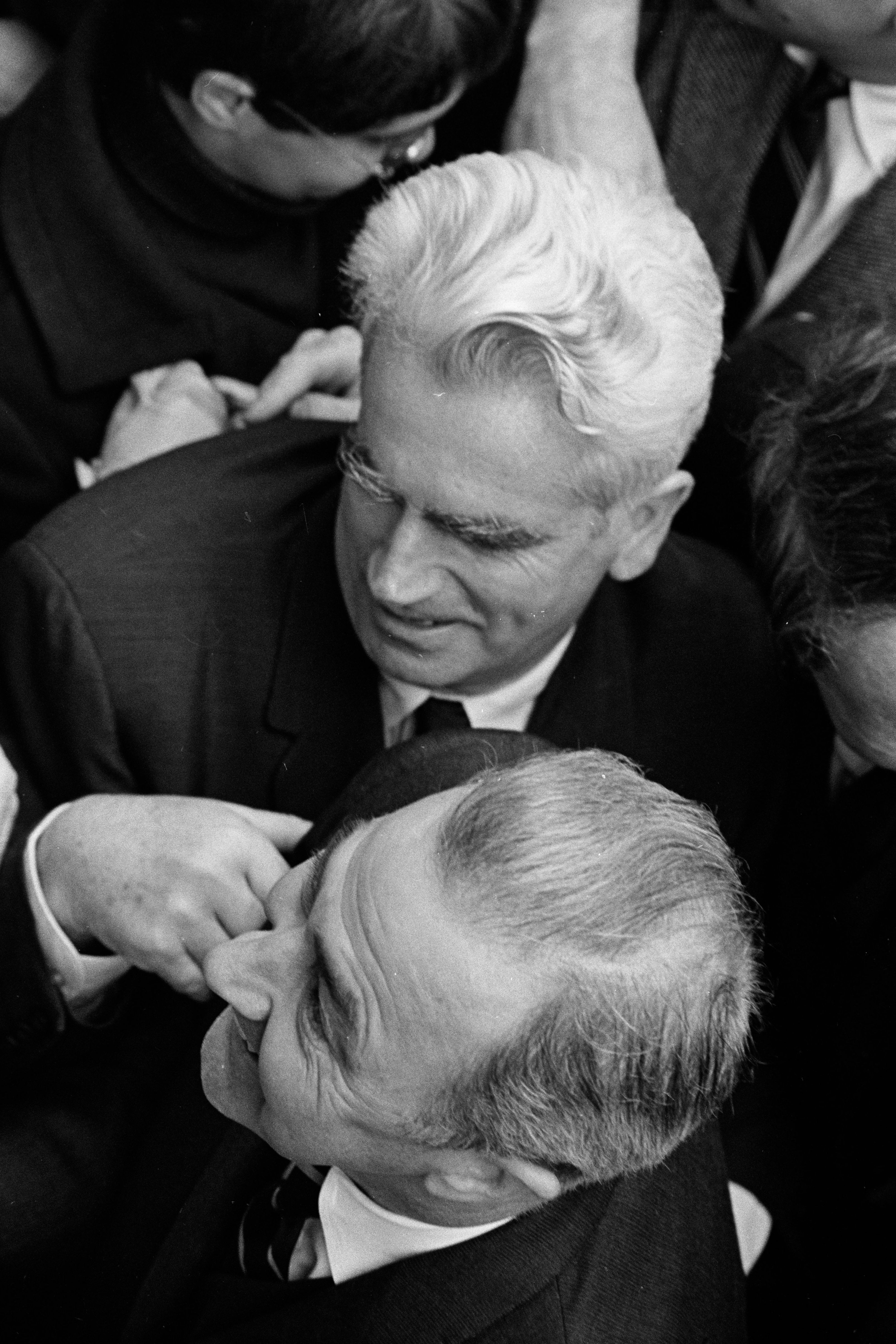
McCarthy (below) with supporter Paul O'Dwyer at campaign headquarters, 64 West 56th Street, New York City, April 23, 1968

Some of those who joined McCarthy's effort early on were Kennedy loyalists. Now that Kennedy was in the race, many of them jumped ship, urging McCarthy to drop out and support Kennedy. McCarthy resented that Kennedy had let him do the "dirty work" of challenging Johnson and entered the race only when it became apparent that Johnson was vulnerable. As a result, while he initially entered the campaign with few illusions of winning, McCarthy now devoted himself to beating Kennedy (and Humphrey, who entered the race after Johnson withdrew) and gaining the nomination.

Humphrey, long a champion of labor unions and of civil rights, entered the race with the support of the party "establishment", including members of Congress, mayors, governors and labor union leaders. He entered too late to compete in any primaries, but had the support of Johnson and Democratic insiders.

Kennedy, like his brother John in 1960, planned to win the nomination through popular support in the primaries. McCarthy and Kennedy squared off in California, knowing that the result there would be decisive. They both campaigned vigorously up and down the state, with many polls showing them neck-and-neck, and some predicting a McCarthy victory. A televised debate between them began to tilt undecided voters away from McCarthy. He made two statements many found ill-considered: that he would accept a government including Communists in South Vietnam, and that only the relocation of inner-city blacks would solve the urban problem. Kennedy pounced, portraying the former idea as soft on communism and the latter as a scheme to bus tens of thousands of ghetto residents into white, conservative Orange County. Kennedy won the California primary on June 4, but was shot after his victory speech at the Ambassador Hotel in Los Angeles, and died soon afterward. In response, McCarthy refrained from political action for several days. One aide recalled McCarthy sneering about his fallen rival, saying that Kennedy was "demagoguing to the last". Another heard McCarthy say that Kennedy had "brought it on himself"—implying that he had provoked Sirhan Sirhan, the Palestinian gunman convicted of killing him, by promising military support to the state of Israel.

Despite strong showings in several primaries—he won more votes than any other Democratic candidate—McCarthy garnered only 23% of the delegates at the 1968 Democratic National Convention, largely due to state-party organizations' control over the delegate-selection process. After Kennedy's assassination, many Kennedy delegates, remembering his bitter war of words with McCarthy, chose to support George McGovern rather than McCarthy. Moreover, although Humphrey was not clearly an antiwar candidate, some antiwar Democrats hoped that as president he might succeed where Johnson had failed and extricate the US from Vietnam. On June 23, 1968, Humphrey defeated McCarthy, securing significant delegates in their shared home state of Minnesota. Before election day, McCarthy confirmed that he would personally vote for Humphrey, but said that he would go no further than that, stopping short of endorsing him. Although McCarthy did not win the Democratic nomination, the antiwar "New Party", which ran several candidates for president that year, listed him as its nominee on the ballot in Arizona, where he received 2,751 votes, and in Vermont, gaining 579 votes. He appeared on the Oregon ballot as the New Party choice. He received 20,721 votes as a write-in candidate in California.

In The Real Majority, Richard M. Scammon and Ben Wattenberg propose that up to three-fifths of McCarthy's backers supported him because they felt President Johnson had not escalated the war quickly enough, alleging that his victory was not due to "peaceniks" so much as "fed-up-niks".

Despite McCarthy's antiwar stance, North Vietnam's Communist government had a cynical attitude toward him, largely because his campaign's lack of money made it highly skeptical of what he could achieve, calling him "a second-rate politician with little experience or money" in its analysis of the presidential election published in its Army Newspaper on August 10, 1968.

== Later life ==
=== 1972 presidential campaign ===
McCarthy returned to politics as a candidate for the Democratic presidential nomination in 1972, but he fared poorly in New Hampshire and Wisconsin and soon dropped out.

Illinois was the only primary in which McCarthy actively participated. He got 38% of the vote to the then leading contender Edmund Muskie's 59%, but the media ignored McCarthy's Illinois campaign.

=== 1976 presidential campaign ===
After his 1972 campaign, McCarthy left the Democratic Party, and ran as an independent candidate for president in 1976. During that campaign, he took a libertarian stance on civil liberties, promised to create full employment by shortening the work week, came out in favor of nuclear disarmament, attacked the Internal Revenue Service, and said whom he would nominate to various Cabinet posts if elected. Mainly, however, he battled ballot access laws he deemed too restrictive and encouraged voters to reject the two-party system.

His numerous legal battles during the election, along with a strong grassroots effort in friendly states, allowed him to appear on the ballot in 30 states and eased ballot access for later third-party candidates. His party affiliation was variously listed on ballots as "Independent," "McCarthy '76," "Non-Partisan," "Nom. Petition," "Nomination," "Not Designated," and "Court Order". Although he was not on the California and Wyoming ballots, he was recognized as a write-in candidate in those states. In many states, he did not run with a vice-presidential nominee, but he came to have a total of 15 running mates in states where he was required to have one. At least eight of his running mates were women.

Nationally, McCarthy received 740,460 votes, 0.91% of the total, finishing third in the election. His best showing came in Oregon, where he received 40,207 votes, 3.90% of the vote.

=== Further activism ===
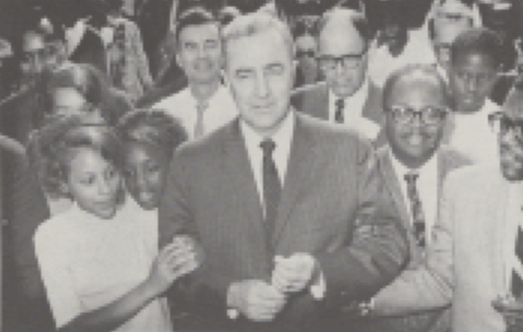
McCarthy in 1968

McCarthy opposed Watergate-era campaign finance laws, becoming a plaintiff in the landmark case Buckley v. Valeo, 424 U.S. 1 (1976), in which the U.S. Supreme Court held that certain provisions of federal campaign finance laws were unconstitutional. McCarthy, the New York Civil Liberties Union, philanthropist Stewart Mott, the Conservative Party of New York State, the Mississippi Republican Party, and the Libertarian Party were the co-plaintiffs with U.S. Senator James L. Buckley, becoming key players in killing campaign spending limits and advancing the idea that money is speech, which has guided the Supreme Court in campaign finance cases ever since.

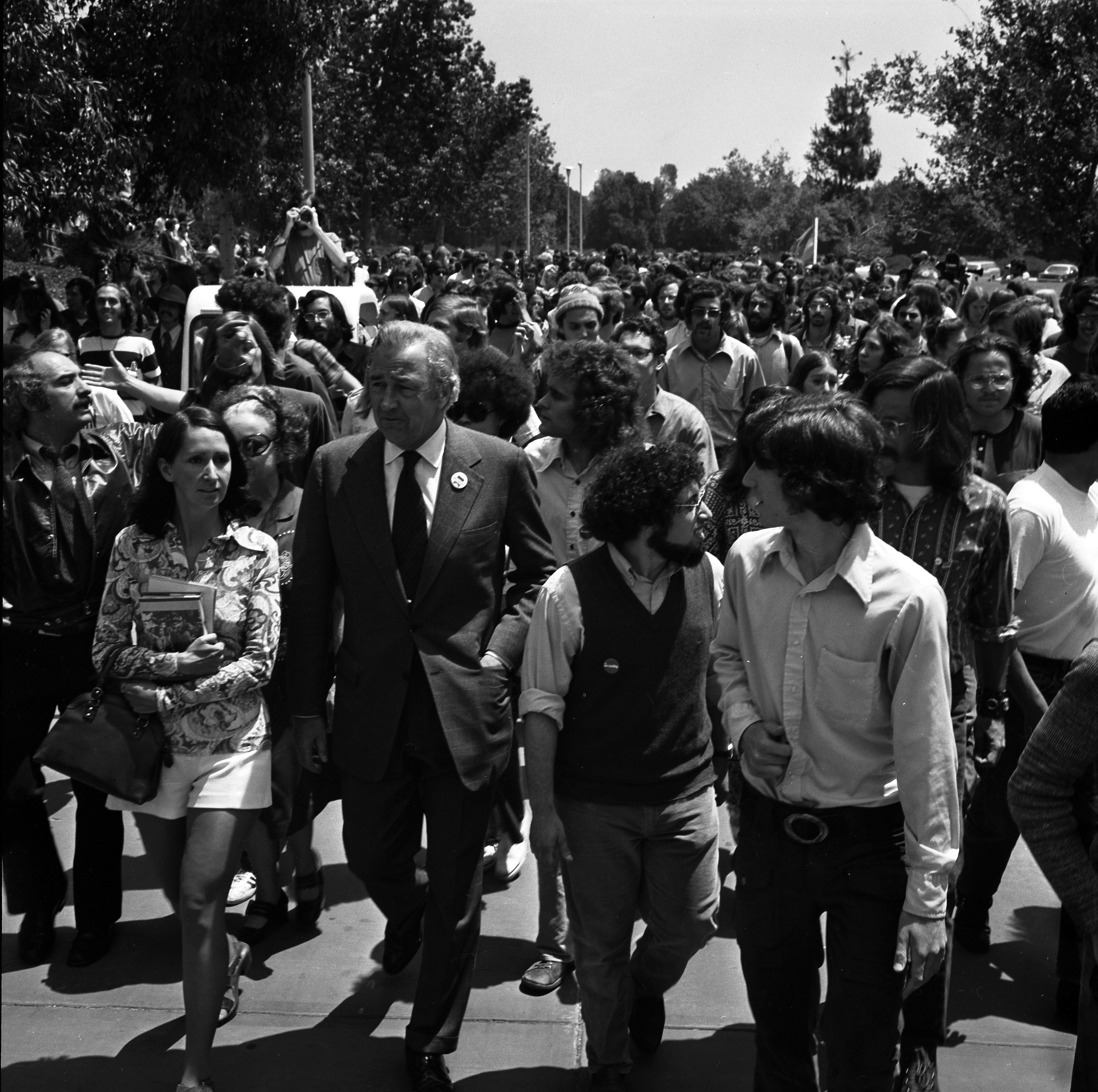
McCarthy with students of the San Fernando Valley State College on an anti-Vietnam War march in 1972

In 1980, dismayed by what he saw as the abject failure of Jimmy Carter's presidency (he later said that "he was the worst president we ever had"), he appeared in a campaign ad for Libertarian candidate Ed Clark and wrote the introduction to Clark's campaign book. He eventually endorsed Ronald Reagan for president.

=== Final campaigns ===
In 1982, McCarthy ran for his old Senate seat but lost the Democratic primary to businessman Mark Dayton, 69% to 24%.

In the 1988 election, McCarthy appeared on the ballot as the presidential candidate of a handful of left-wing state parties, specifically the Consumer parties in Pennsylvania and New Jersey and the Minnesota Progressive Party in Minnesota. In his campaign, he supported trade protectionism, Reagan's Strategic Defense Initiative and the abolition of the two-party system. He received 30,905 votes.

In 1992, returning to the Democratic Party, he entered the New Hampshire presidential primary and campaigned for the Democratic nomination, but was excluded from the first televised debate. Along with other candidates who had been excluded from the 1992 Democratic debates (including two-time New Alliance Party presidential candidate Lenora Fulani, Irvine, California mayor Larry Agran, Billy Jack actor Tom Laughlin, and others), McCarthy staged protests and took unsuccessful legal action in an attempt to be included in the debates. Unlike the other excluded candidates, McCarthy was a longstanding national figure and had mounted credible campaigns for president in previous elections. He won 108,679 votes in the 1992 primaries. In his campaign for the Democratic nomination, McCarthy proposed the use of import fees to help Japan and Western Europe pay for military security and raise taxes on the wealthy in order to eliminate the national debt.

== Personal life ==
McCarthy and his wife, Abigail Quigley McCarthy, had five children. They met while Quigley was working as a teacher in Mandan, North Dakota. They married on June 5, 1945, in St. Paul, Minnesota.

In 1969, McCarthy separated from his wife after 24 years of marriage, but they never divorced. The children stayed with their mother after the separation. According to McCarthy biographer Dominic Sandbrook, McCarthy had a romantic relationship with CBS News correspondent Marya McLaughlin that lasted until McLaughlin's death in 1998.

McCarthy's niece Mary Beth was married to folk singer Peter Yarrow.

== Death and legacy ==
McCarthy died of complications from Parkinson's disease at age 89 on December 10, 2005, in a retirement home in Georgetown, Washington, D.C., where he had lived for the previous few years. Former President Bill Clinton gave his eulogy.

Following his death the College of Saint Benedict and Saint John's University renamed their Public Policy Center the Eugene J. McCarthy Center for Public Policy. The Democratic party memorialized his death during the 2008 Democratic National Convention in Denver, Colorado, on August 28, 2008. The memorial included pictures of several prominent Democrats who had died during the four-year period since the 2004 Convention displayed on a large screen. During McCarthy's tribute, the screen displaying his photograph mistakenly left off his first name but included his middle name, calling him "Senator Joseph McCarthy"; Joseph McCarthy was a notable Republican Senator from Wisconsin famous for his anti-Communist campaigning and sparring with journalist Edward R. Murrow.

In 2009, his alma mater, St. John's University, honored McCarthy by establishing the Eugene McCarthy Distinguished Public Service Award.

McCarthy's files as U.S. congressman (Democratic Farmer-Labor) from Minnesota's 4th district (1949–1959) and as U.S. senator from Minnesota (1959–1971) are available at the Minnesota History Center for research. They include executive files, general files, legislative files, personal files, political and campaign (including senatorial, vice presidential, and presidential) files, public relations files, sound and visual materials (with photographs), and speeches.

== Electoral history ==
McCarthy's presidential campaign results
Election	Party	votes	%
1968 (primary)	Democratic Party	2,914,933	38.7%
1972 (primary)	Democratic Party	553,352	1.7%
1976	Independent	740,460	0.91%
1988	Consumer	30,905	0.03%

== Bibliography ==
=== Publishing ===
After leaving the Senate in 1971, McCarthy became a senior editor at Harcourt Brace Jovanovich Publishing and a syndicated newspaper columnist. In the 1960s he began writing poetry, and his increased political prominence led to increased interest in his work. "If any of you are secret poets, the best way to break into print is to run for the presidency", he wrote in 1968. He published a collection of poetry in 1997, Cool Reflections: Poetry For The Who, What, When, Where and Especially Why of It All (ISBN 1-57553-595-5).

=== Books ===
- Frontiers in American Democracy (1960)
- Dictionary of American Politics (1962)
- A Liberal Answer to the Conservative Challenge (1964)
- The Limits of Power: America's Role in the World (1967)
- First Things First: Priorities for America (1968)
- The Year of the People (1969)
- Mr. Raccoon and His Friends (1977; Academy Press Ltd., Chicago, IL); children's stories, illustrated by James Ecklund
- A Political Bestiary, by Eugene J. McCarthy and James J. Kilpatrick (1979) ISBN 0-380-46508-6
- The Ultimate Tyranny: The Majority Over the Majority (1980) ISBN 0-15-192581-X
- Gene McCarthy's Minnesota: Memories of a Native Son (1982) ISBN 0-86683-681-0
- Complexities and Contrarities (1982) ISBN 0-15-121202-3
- Up Til Now: A Memoir (1987)
- Required Reading: A Decade of Political Wit and Wisdom (1988) ISBN 0-15-176880-3
- Nonfinancial Economics: The Case for Shorter Hours of Work, by Eugene McCarthy and William McGaughey (1989) ISBN 0-275-92514-5
- A Colony of the World: The United States Today (1992) ISBN 0-7818-0102-8
- Eugene J. McCarthy: Selected Poems by Eugene J. McCarthy, Ray Howe (1997) ISBN 1-883477-15-8
- No-Fault Politics (1998) ISBN 0-8129-3016-9
- 1968: War and Democracy (2000) ISBN 1-883477-37-9
- Hard Years: Antidotes to Authoritarians (2001) ISBN 1-883477-38-7
- From Rappahannock County (2002) ISBN 1-883477-51-4
- Parting Shots from My Brittle Bow: Reflections on American Politics and Life (2005) ISBN 1-55591-528-0

== See also ==
- List of peace activists

== Sources ==
- Dominic Sandbrook, Eugene McCarthy and The Rise and Fall of American Liberalism (2005).

U.S. House of Representatives
Preceded by Edward Devitt	Member of the U.S. House of Representatives from Minnesota's 4th congressional district 1949–1959	Succeeded by Joseph Karth
Party political offices
Preceded by William E. Carlson	Democratic nominee for U.S. Senator from Minnesota (Class 1); 1958, 1964	Succeeded by Hubert Humphrey
U.S. Senate
Preceded by Edward John Thye	U.S. Senator (Class 1) from Minnesota; 1959–1971; Served alongside: Hubert Humphrey, Walter Mondale	Succeeded by Hubert Humphrey
