= Withdrawal of Lyndon B. Johnson from the 1968 United States presidential election =

Major event in the run-up to the 1968 United states presidential election

- Part of the presidency of Lyndon B. Johnson and the 1968 Democratic Party presidential primaries
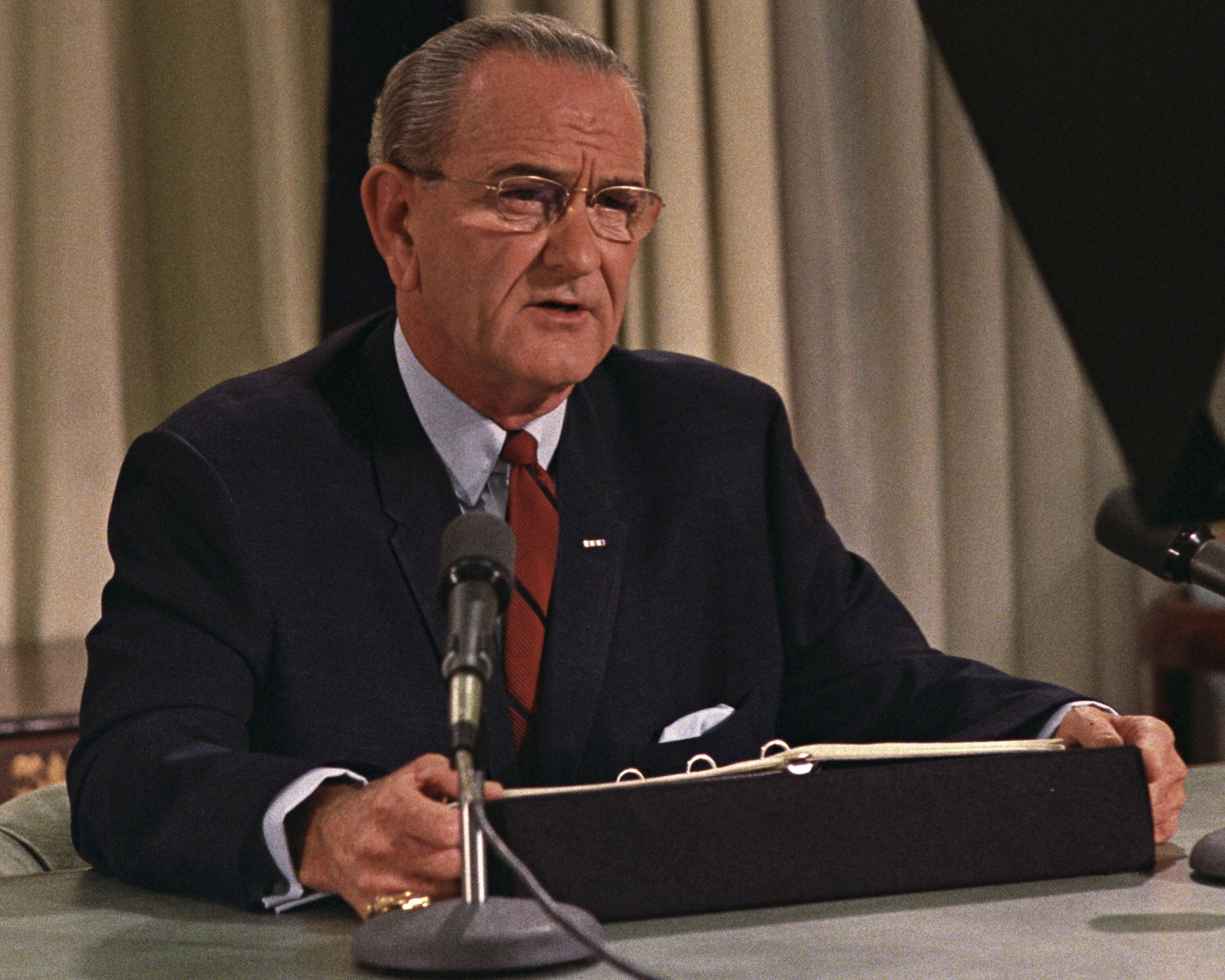
- President Johnson announces that he will not run for re-election.
- Date: March 31, 1968; 58 years ago
- Location: White House
- Outcome: The Hubert Humphrey 1968 presidential campaign was launched on April 27, 1968.; Humphrey officially became the Democratic presidential nominee on August 29, 1968.; Richard Nixon was elected the 37th president on November 5, 1968.; Johnson retired when Nixon was inaugurated on January 20, 1969.
- Excerpt from Johnson's address

On March 31, 1968, incumbent U.S. president Lyndon B. Johnson made a surprise announcement during a televised address to the nation that began around 9 p.m., declaring that he would not seek re-election for another term and was withdrawing from the 1968 United States presidential election. Johnson stated: "I shall not seek, and I will not accept, the nomination of my party for another term as your president."

At first, Johnson's only significant challenger in the 1968 Democratic Party presidential primaries was Eugene McCarthy, an anti-war U.S. senator from Minnesota. Johnson's announcement that he himself would drop out of the race came after McCarthy nearly won the New Hampshire primary and Senator Robert F. Kennedy, another critic of the war and the brother of the late president John F. Kennedy, entered the race. Johnson's decision and the assassination of Kennedy opened the door for Vice President Hubert Humphrey to become the Democratic Party's nominee. The 1968 Democratic National Convention, held in Chicago, was marked by significant protests and clashes between demonstrators and police, reflecting the deep divisions within the nation.

The 1968 election saw Republican Party candidate Richard Nixon emerge victorious, defeating Humphrey and third-party candidate George Wallace. Nixon's campaign capitalized on themes of law and order and a promise to end the Vietnam War conflict and United States involvement, which resonated with many voters who were fed up with Johnson’s mishandling of the war.

== Background ==
Lyndon B. Johnson, the 36th president of the United States, assumed office following the assassination of President John F. Kennedy on November 22, 1963. The following year, Johnson was subsequently elected in his own right in one of the biggest landslide victories in American history, in the 1964 United States presidential election, defeating Republican Party nominee Barry Goldwater. His presidency was marked by significant legislative achievements, including the Civil Rights Act of 1964, the Voting Rights Act of 1965, ratification of the Twenty-fourth and Twenty-fifth Amendment, and the establishment of Medicare and Medicaid.

=== Presidents who did not seek re-election ===
Historically, most sitting U.S. Presidents who completed one full term chose to run for a second. Seven presidents were eligible for re-election after completing at least one full term in office, but chose not to run.

=== Vietnam War ===
Johnson's tenure, however, wound up being overshadowed by various conflicts of interests, such as resistance to escalation of U.S. involvement in the conflict. Public opinion turned increasingly against the war with Anti-War movements spreading across the country. The Tet Offensive in early 1968 further eroded support for the war and Johnson's handling of it.

=== Dump Johnson movement ===
As the 1968 election approached, Johnson began to lose control of the Democratic Party, which was splitting into four factions. The first group consisted of Johnson and Humphrey, labor unions, and local party bosses (led by Chicago Mayor Richard J. Daley). The second group consisted of antiwar students and intellectuals who coalesced behind Senator Eugene McCarthy in an effort to "dump Johnson". The third group included Catholics, Hispanics and African Americans, who rallied behind Senator Robert F. Kennedy. The fourth group consisted of traditionally segregationist White Southerners like Governor George Wallace.

=== Public opinion and political challenges ===
Johnson's approval ratings had declined significantly by 1968, with his approval rating at the time of his withdrawal being 36 percent. Despite Johnson's growing unpopularity, conventional wisdom held that it would be impossible to deny re-nomination to a sitting president. Johnson won a narrow victory as a write-in candidate in the New Hampshire presidential primary on March 12, against McCarthy 49–42%, but this close second-place result dramatically boosted McCarthy's standing in the race. Kennedy announced his candidacy on March 16.

=== Weary of office and presidential position ===
Historians have debated why Johnson quit a few days after his weak showing in New Hampshire. Jeff Shesol says Johnson wanted out of the White House, but also wanted vindication; when the indicators turned negative, he decided to leave. Lewis L. Gould says that Johnson had neglected the Democratic party, was hurting it by his Vietnam policies, and under-estimated McCarthy's strength until the last minute, when it was too late for Johnson to recover. Randall Bennett Woods said Johnson realized he needed to leave, for the nation to heal. Robert Dallek writes that Johnson had no further domestic goals, and realized that his personality had eroded his popularity. His health was poor, and he was pre-occupied with the Kennedy campaign; his wife was pressing for his retirement, and his base of support continued to shrink. Leaving the race would allow him to pose as a peace-maker. Anthony J. Bennett, however, said Johnson "had been forced out of a re-election race in 1968 by outrage over his policy in Southeast Asia".

In 2009, an AP reporter said that Johnson decided to end his re-election bid after CBS News anchor Walter Cronkite, who was influential, turned against the president's policy in Vietnam. During a CBS News editorial which aired on February 27, Cronkite recommended the US pursue peace negotiations. After watching Cronkite's editorial, Johnson allegedly exclaimed: "If I've lost Cronkite, I've lost Middle America." This quote by Johnson has been disputed for accuracy. Johnson was attending Texas Governor John Connally's birthday gala in Austin, Texas, when Cronkite's editorial aired, and did not see the original broadcast; but Cronkite and CBS News correspondent Bob Schieffer defended reports that the remark had been made. They said that members of Johnson's inner circle, who had watched the editorial with the president, including presidential aide George Christian and journalist Bill Moyers, later confirmed the accuracy of the quote to them. Schieffer, who was a reporter for the Star-Telegram's WBAP television station in Fort Worth, Texas, when Cronkite's editorial aired, acknowledged reports that the president saw the editorial's original broadcast were inaccurate, but claimed the president was able to watch a taping of it the morning after it aired and then made the remark. However, Johnson's January 27, 1968, phone conversation with Chicago Mayor Richard J. Daley revealed their earlier knowledge of Kennedy's intention to run in the 1968 Democratic Party presidential primaries, with the two also trying to feed Robert Kennedy's ego so he would stay in the race, convincing him that the Democratic Party was undergoing a "revolution". They suggested Johnson might instead run as vice president.

== Political and public response ==
=== Democratic Party ===
After the televised announcement of his withdrawal, the Johnsons took calls from fellow Democrats in the White House bedroom, who expressed a mix of respect, disappointment, and understanding towards his announcement, some left dumbfounded. Former Presidents and key figures within the party praised Johnson's presidency and his decision to step aside. Former President Harry S. Truman commended Johnson's service, highlighting his belief that Johnson acted in the best interests of the country and the Democratic Party. Democratic leaders struggled to figure out how to respond to Johnson's sudden withdrawal. This led to bitter battle for succession among Democrats. Some Democrats were worried that a new nominee, selected by the convention, would lack legitimacy since they would have secured the nomination without direct input from Democratic voters around the country.

After Johnson's withdrawal, the Democratic Party quickly split into four factions.

- The first faction consisted of labor unions and big-city party bosses (led by Mayor Richard J. Daley). This group had traditionally controlled the Democratic Party since the days of President Franklin D. Roosevelt, and they feared loss of their control over the party. After Johnson's withdrawal this group rallied to support Hubert Humphrey, Johnson's vice-president; it was also believed that President Johnson himself was covertly supporting Humphrey, despite his public claims of neutrality.
- The second faction, which rallied behind Senator Eugene McCarthy, was composed of college students, intellectuals, and upper-middle-class urban Whites who had been the early activists against the war in Vietnam; they perceived themselves as the future of the Democratic Party.
- The third group was primarily composed of African Americans and Hispanic Americans, as well as some anti-war groups; these groups rallied behind Senator Robert F. Kennedy.
- The fourth group consisted of White Southern Democrats. Some older voters, remembering the New Deal's positive impact upon the rural South, supported Vice-president Humphrey. Many would rally behind the third-party campaign of former Alabama Governor George Wallace as a "law and order" candidate.

Since the Vietnam War had become the major issue that was dividing the Democratic Party, and Johnson had come to symbolize the war for many liberal Democrats, Johnson believed that he could not win the nomination without a major struggle, and that he would probably lose the election in November to the Republicans. However, by withdrawing from the race, he could avoid the stigma of defeat, and he could keep control of the party machinery by giving the nomination to Humphrey, who had been a loyal vice-president. Milne (2011) argues that, in terms of foreign-policy in the Vietnam War, Johnson at the end wanted Nixon to be president rather than Humphrey, since Johnson agreed with Nixon, rather than Humphrey, on the need to defend South Vietnam from communism. However, Johnson's telephone calls show that Johnson believed the Nixon camp was deliberately sabotaging the Paris peace talks. He told Humphrey, who refused to use allegations based on illegal wiretaps of a presidential candidate. Nixon himself called Johnson and denied the allegations. Dallek concludes that Nixon's advice to Saigon made no difference, and that Humphrey was so closely identified with Johnson's unpopular policies that no last-minute deal with Hanoi could have affected the election.

=== Anti-war activists and the Republican Party ===
Many anti-war activists rejoiced at the news. Some of them concluded that their movement had forced Johnson to alter his war policy and to decide that he could not win another term. Antiwar protesters chanted outside the White House, "Hey, hey, LBJ! How many kids did you kill today?" After Johnson's withdrawal, many Republicans underwent an anguished reappraisal concerning Richard Nixon's chances for winning the election in November.

== International response ==
=== South Vietnam ===
South Vietnamese officials viewed Johnson's withdrawal with concern, mainly with the threat of an anti-war candidate unwilling to support them and threatening to withdraw troops. During this time, South Vietnamese President Nguyễn Văn Thiệu was eagerly anticipating the results of the American election, believing he could secure a more favorable agreement with Republican candidate Nixon than with the incumbent administration. Messages implying this were secretly communicated to Thieu's representatives by Nixon's associates. President Johnson, enraged and appalled, discovered evidence of this through phone taps, intercepts, and surveillance, considering it a potentially treasonous act.

=== Global anti-war movement ===
Johnson's decision was seen as a victory by anti-war activists around the world. His withdrawal was viewed by some as a sign that public and international pressure could influence the policies of powerful nations.

== Aftermath ==
Within the week of Johnson's announcement, American civil rights activist and oppositionist to the Vietnam War Martin Luther King Jr. was assassinated in Memphis, Tennessee, at the Lorraine Motel. Many US cities were convulsed in rioting following King's death. Johnson was in the Oval Office that evening, planning a meeting in Hawaii with Vietnam War military commanders. After press secretary George Christian informed him at 8:20 p.m. of the assassination, he canceled the trip to focus on the nation. He assigned Attorney General Ramsey Clark to investigate the assassination in Memphis. He made a personal call to King's wife, Coretta Scott King, and declared April 7 a national day of mourning on which the U.S. flag would be flown at half-staff. After Johnson's withdrawal, and the assassination of Robert F. Kennedy, McCarthy was Humphrey's only major opponent until George McGovern entered the race. Humphrey would end up losing the election to the antiwar Republican Richard Nixon, who portrayed himself as a figure of stability during this period of national unrest and upheaval.

The defeat left Humphrey in a state of depression. To keep him active, his friends helped him get hired as a professor at Macalester College and the University of Minnesota. The perceived failures of the Vietnam War nurtured disillusionment with government, and the New Deal coalition fell apart in large part due to tensions over the Vietnam War and the 1968 election. Republicans won five of six presidential elections after Johnson left office. Ronald Reagan came into office in 1981 vowing to undo the Great Society, though he and other Republicans were unable to repeal many of Johnson's programs.

== Legacy ==
Hubert Humphrey and Kamala Harris
Left to right:
Vice presidents Hubert Humphrey and Kamala Harris. Both narrowly lost the 1968 and 2024 United States presidential elections, respectively.

Johnson's withdrawal was very similar to Joe Biden’s withdrawal from the 2024 presidential election 56 years later. Johnson in 1964 and Biden in 2020 had won convincing victories, but their approval ratings declined over the course of their presidencies. Biden had age and health concerns during his presidency, and withdrew after the 2024 Joe Biden–Donald Trump presidential debate.

In both cases, their vice presidents—Hubert Humphrey and Kamala Harris, lost to a former losing Republican presidential nominee—Richard Nixon and Donald Trump, who successfully won the presidential election. Humphrey lost the popular vote by 0.7% in 1968, and Harris lost the popular vote by 1.5% in 2024. Coincidentally, the Democratic National Conventions in both years were held in Chicago, and the presidential elections of 1968 and 2024 took place on November 5. The one main difference was that there was no major third-party candidate in 2024, unlike George Wallace in 1968.

== See also ==
- I do not choose to run, Calvin Coolidge's decision not to run for another term in 1928
