= Lloyd W. Bailey =

American faithless elector (1928–2020)

- Born: Lloyd Whitfield Bailey; March 24, 1928; Rocky Mount, North Carolina, U.S.
- Died: August 12, 2020 (aged 92); Rocky Mount, North Carolina, U.S.
- Education: Wake Forest College (BS); Jefferson Medical College (MD)
- Occupations: Physician; ophthalmologist
- Organization: John Birch Society
- Known for: Faithless elector in the 1968 U.S. presidential election
- Political party: Republican

Lloyd Whitfield Bailey (March 24, 1928 – August 12, 2020) was a medical doctor and ophthalmologist from Rocky Mount, North Carolina, who achieved notoriety as a faithless elector during the 1968 U.S. presidential election. He became a faithless elector on December 16, 1968. Because Bailey did not vote for Nixon, the candidate received 301 electoral votes instead of the expected 302 electoral votes (based on state results). However, Bailey's vote did not affect the outcome of the election, and Nixon was elected.

== Career ==
Bailey received a BS degree at Wake Forest College in 1949, and an MD degree from Jefferson Medical College in 1953. He completed his residency and training in Philadelphia at University of Pennsylvania and Wills Eye Hospital.

A strong conservative, Bailey became a life member of the John Birch Society in 1961. By 1968 he had joined the Republican Party and become active in it, being chosen as an elector at the state party convention that year.

In the 1968 presidential election, Republican candidates Richard Nixon (the election winner) and Spiro Agnew carried North Carolina. But Bailey, although he was a Republican-pledged elector, cast his vote for American Independent Party presidential nominee George Wallace and his running-mate Curtis LeMay. Wallace and LeMay carried elections in five Southern states (Alabama, Arkansas, Georgia, Louisiana and Mississippi) resulting in 45 electoral votes. Bailey's vote gave them a total of 46 electoral votes.

When confronted about his action, Bailey at first claimed that when he was chosen as an elector by state Republican Party convention, he had not pledged to cast his votes for Nixon and Agnew. Bailey further claimed that since Wallace had won in the district he represented, he was obligated to cast his votes for Wallace and LeMay. He also claimed that he forgot all about it until a party official reminded him of his electoral duties.

Bailey, a staunch right-winger and a member of the John Birch Society, later admitted that he did not vote for Nixon because the candidate had announced his intention to appoint Henry Kissinger and Daniel Patrick Moynihan to government positions (who had served Democratic administrations), and had asked Chief Justice Earl Warren to stay in office through the end of June 1969. Bailey stated that if altering his vote would have changed the outcome of the presidential election, he would not have done it, and that he voted for Wallace as a protest. He became known as a "protest elector" and is officially classified as a "faithless elector".

Due to Bailey's actions some members of Congress, most notably Senator Edmund Muskie (D-ME) (a defeated Democratic vice presidential nominee) and Representative James O'Hara (D-MI) tried to invoke an 1887 statute under which both houses of the United States Congress may disqualify any vote by an elector that has not been "regularly given." However, the motion was defeated. Bailey was required to appear at congressional hearings regarding this case.

Bailey's actions prompted calls for reform of the system. Polls at the time showed that the vast majority of Americans, over 70%, would support replacing the Electoral College with popular, direct voting as advocated by Senator Birch Bayh (D-IN), or retaining electoral votes without the electors, as proposed by Congressman Hale Boggs (D-LA).

In 1969, in response to Bailey's vote, North Carolina passed a law requiring electors to vote for the nominee of their party.

In 2008, at the age of 80, Bailey was appointed to the JBS Council.
