= Nationwide opinion polling for the 1968 United States presidential election =

This article provides a list of scientific, nationwide public opinion polls that were conducted relating to the 1968 United States presidential election.

== Presidential election ==
=== Richard Nixon vs Hubert Humphrey vs George Wallace ===
Polling aggregates key
Color	Candidate or event
	Richard Nixon
	Hubert Humphrey
	George Wallace
	Undecided/Other
	Conventions

View source data.

Poll source	Date	Richard Nixon Republican	Hubert Humphrey Democratic	George Wallace American Ind.	Undecided/Other	Leading by (points)
Election Results	November 5, 1968	43.42%	42.72%	13.53%	0.33%	0.70
Harris	November 4, 1968	40%	43%	13%	4%	3
Gallup	November 4, 1968	42%	40%	14%	4%	2
Harris	November 1, 1968	40%	37%	16%	7%	3
Gallup	October 24, 1968	44%	36%	15%	5%	8
Harris	October 18, 1968	40%	35%	18%	7%	5
Gallup	October 9, 1968	44%	29%	20%	7%	8
Gallup	September 29, 1968	43%	28%	21%	8%	15
Harris	September 23, 1968	39%	31%	21%	9%	8
Gallup	September 11, 1968	43%	31%	19%	7%	12
Harris	August 27, 1968	40%	34%	17%	9%	6
Gallup	August 21, 1968	45%	29%	18%	8%	16
Harris	July 31, 1968	36%	41%	16%	7%	5
Crossley	July 31, 1968	39%	36%	19%	6%	3
Gallup	July 31, 1968	40%	38%	16%	6%	2
Harris	July 20, 1968	35%	37%	17%	11%	2
Gallup	July 11, 1968	35%	40%	16%	9%	5
Harris	June 24, 1968	-	-	-	-	7
Gallup	June 23, 1968	37%	42%	14%	7%	5
Gallup	June 12, 1968	36%	42%	14%	8%	6
Harris	May 23, 1968	37%	41%	14%	8%	4
Gallup	May 12, 1968	39%	36%	14%	11%	3
Harris	May 6, 1968	36%	38%	13%	13%	2
Gallup	April 21, 1968	43%	34%	14%	9%	9
Harris	April 6, 1968	34%	35%	12%	19%	1

== Hypothetical Polling ==
=== Richard Nixon vs Eugene McCarthy vs George Wallace ===
Poll source	Date	Richard Nixon Republican	Eugene McCarthy Democratic	George Wallace American Ind.	Undecided	Leading by (points)
Harris	August 27, 1968	41%	35%	16%	8%	6
Gallup	August 21, 1968	42%	37%	16%	5%	5
Harris	July 31, 1968	35%	43%	15%	7%	8
Crossley	July 31, 1968	40%	41%	11%	8%	1
Gallup	July 31, 1968	41%	36%	16%	7%	5
Harris	July 20, 1968	34%	42%	16%	8%	8
Gallup	July 11, 1968	36%	39%	18%	7%	3
Gallup	June 23, 1968	39%	41%	14%	6%	2
Harris	May 23, 1968	40%	39%	14%	7%	1
Gallup	May 12, 1968	39%	36%	14%	10%	3
Harris	May 6, 1968	37%	40%	13%	10%	3
Gallup	April 21, 1968	41%	38%	10%	11%	3
Harris	April 6, 1968	33%	39%	10%	18%	6

=== Richard Nixon vs Lyndon Johnson vs George Wallace ===
Poll source	Date	Richard Nixon Republican	Lyndon Johnson Democratic	George Wallace American Ind.	Undecided	Leading by (points)
Harris	August 28, 1968	42%	36%	16%	6%	6
Harris	July 30, 1968	35%	41%	17%	7%	6
Harris	March, 1968 (Note: The original announcement of the March Harris poll has not been found in the New York Times' Archives, but it is referenced in comparison to a later poll made in July.)	39%	41%	13%	7%	3
Gallup	March 26, 1968	41%	39%	-	14%	3
Harris	February 27, 1968	38%	47%	11%	4%	9
Gallup	February 24, 1968	42%	42%	-	16%	Tied
Gallup	February 24, 1968	39%	39%	11%	11%	Tied
Harris	February 20, 1968	43%	48%	-	9%	5
Gallup	January 20, 1968	39%	51%	-	10%	12

=== Richard Nixon vs Lyndon Johnson vs George Wallace vs Eugene McCarthy ===
Poll source	Date	Richard Nixon Republican	Lyndon Johnson Democratic	George Wallace American Ind.	Eugene McCarthy Peace	Undecided	Leading by (points)
Gallup	January 6, 1968	30%	39%	11%	12%	8%	9

=== Richard Nixon vs Robert Kennedy vs George Wallace ===
Poll source	Date	Richard Nixon Republican	Robert Kennedy Democratic	George Wallace American Ind.	Undecided	Leading by (points)
Harris	May 23, 1968	40%	42%	13%	5%	2
Gallup	May 12, 1968	42%	32%	15%	11%	10
Harris	May 6, 1968	40%	38%	14%	8%	2
Gallup	April 21, 1968	41%	38%	10%	11%	3
Harris	April 6, 1968	35%	41%	8%	16%	6

=== Nelson Rockefeller vs Hubert Humphrey vs George Wallace ===
Poll source	Date	Nelson Rockefeller Republican	Hubert Humphrey Democratic	George Wallace American Ind.	Undecided	Leading by (points)
Harris	July 31, 1968	40%	34%	20%	6%	6
Crossley	July 31, 1968	37%	31%	22%	10%	6
Gallup	July 31, 1968	36%	36%	21%	7%	Tied
Harris	July 20, 1968	37%	34%	19%	10%	3
Gallup	July 11, 1968	36%	36%	21%	7%	Tied
Gallup	June 23, 1968	39%	38%	17%	6%	1
Gallup	June 12, 1968	36%	39%	17%	8%	3
Harris	May 23, 1968	37%	40%	17%	6%	3
Gallup	May 12, 1968	40%	33%	16%	11%	3
Harris	May 6, 1968	39%	37%	16%	8%	2

=== Nelson Rockefeller vs Eugene McCarthy vs George Wallace ===
Poll source	Date	Nelson Rockefeller Republican	Eugene McCarthy Democratic	George Wallace American Ind.	Undecided	Leading by (points)
Harris	July 31, 1968	40%	34%	20%	6%	6
Crossley	July 31, 1968	38%	30%	22%	10%	8
Gallup	July 31, 1968	36%	35%	21%	7%	1
Harris	July 20, 1968	32%	38%	20%	10%	6
Gallup	July 11, 1968	35%	37%	20%	8%	2
Gallup	June 23, 1968	38%	39%	16%	7%	1
Harris	May 23, 1968	38%	36%	19%	8%	2
Gallup	May 12, 1968	40%	31%	17%	12%	9
Harris	May 6, 1968	38%	36%	15%	11%	2

=== Nelson Rockefeller vs Robert Kennedy vs George Wallace ===
Poll source	Date	Nelson Rockefeller Republican	Robert Kennedy Democratic	George Wallace American Ind.	Undecided	Leading by (points)
Harris	May 23, 1968	41%	36%	17%	6%	5
Gallup	May 12, 1968	42%	28%	18%	12%	14
Harris	May 6, 1968	41%	33%	17%	9%	8
