= 1968 United States presidential election =

Election of Richard Nixon

- November 5, 1968

538 members of the Electoral College 270 electoral votes needed to win
- Opinion polls
- Turnout: 62.5% (▼0.3 pp)

Nominee	Richard Nixon	Hubert Humphrey	George Wallace
Party	Republican	Democratic (Note: In Alabama, Humphrey was on the ballot as the candidate for the National Democratic Party of Alabama and the Alabama Independent Democratic Party instead. In New York, he was also on the ballot as the Liberal Party of New York candidate.)	American Independent (Note: In Alabama, he was also on the ballot as the Democratic Party candidate; in Mississippi, he was registered as an independent. In other states, although he won electoral votes from none of them, he appeared under various other labels such as "George Wallace Party", "Courage Party", and "American Party" and as an independent candidate.)
Home state	New York (Note: Nixon's official state of residence was New York because he moved there to practice law after his defeat in the 1962 California gubernatorial election. After becoming president, Nixon bought a home in California in mid-May 1969, sold his New York home in late May, and re-established his residency in California by early June. Consequently, most reliable reference books, including the January 6, 1969, edition of the Congressional Record, list his home state in this election as New York.)	Minnesota	Alabama
Running mate	Spiro Agnew	Edmund Muskie	Curtis LeMay (Note: In some states, including Georgia and Mississippi, former Georgia governor Marvin Griffin was George Wallace's running mate instead, although all electors pledged to Wallace also voted for LeMay.)
Electoral vote	301 (Note: In state-by-state tallies, Nixon earned 302 pledged electors, Wallace 45. Nixon lost one vote in North Carolina to Lloyd W. Bailey, who voted for Wallace and LeMay, even though Nixon carried the state.)	191	46
States carried	32	13 + DC	5
Popular vote	31,783,783	31,271,839	9,901,118
Percentage	43.4%	42.7%	13.5%
- Presidential election results map. Red denotes states won by Nixon/Agnew, blue denotes those won by Humphrey/Muskie, and orange denotes those won by Wallace/LeMay, including a North Carolina faithless elector. Numbers indicate electoral votes cast by each state and the District of Columbia.
President before election
Lyndon B. Johnson
Democratic
Elected President
Richard Nixon
Republican

A presidential election was held in the United States on November 5, 1968. The Republican ticket of former Vice President Richard Nixon and Maryland governor Spiro Agnew defeated the Democratic ticket of incumbent Vice President Hubert Humphrey and Senator Edmund Muskie, and the American Independent Party ticket of former Alabama governor George Wallace and general Curtis LeMay. The election cycle was tumultuous and chaotic, and is often characterized as one of the most violent in American history. Later scholarship by historians cite the election as being one of the most important in the 20th century. It was marked by the assassination of Martin Luther King Jr. in early April, and the subsequent riots across the United States; the assassination of Robert F. Kennedy in early June; and widespread opposition to the Vietnam War across university campuses as well as at the Democratic National Convention, which saw police crackdowns on protesters, reporters, and bystanders.

Incumbent president Lyndon B. Johnson was the early frontrunner for the Democratic nomination, but withdrew from the race after only narrowly winning the New Hampshire primary. Humphrey, Eugene McCarthy, and Robert F. Kennedy emerged as the three major candidates in the Democratic primaries until Kennedy was assassinated. Humphrey, who supported the Vietnam War, defeated the anti-war McCarthy to win the Democratic nomination, sparking protests. Humphrey's promise to continue the Johnson administration's War on Poverty and support for the civil rights movement eroded his support in the South, prompting a third-party run by Wallace that campaigned for racial segregation on the basis of "states' rights". Wallace attracted socially conservative voters throughout the South (including Southern Democrats and former Barry Goldwater supporters), as well as White working-class voters in the North and Midwest through his economic populism and anti-establishment rhetoric.

Nixon, who had narrowly lost in 1960 to John F. Kennedy, entered the Republican primaries as the frontrunner, defeating liberal New York governor Nelson Rockefeller, conservative California governor Ronald Reagan, and other candidates to win the nomination. Nixon took advantage of Democratic infighting and mounted a campaign that promised to restore "law and order" to US cities and provide new leadership in the Vietnam War. He aimed at attracting a "silent majority" who were alienated by Humphrey's liberal agenda and Wallace's ultraconservatism; he also pursued a Southern strategy and employed coded language in the Upper South, where the electorate was less extreme on segregation. Humphrey trailed Nixon by wide margins in polls for most of the campaign, but managed to narrow Nixon's lead in October, after Wallace's candidacy collapsed and Johnson suspended bombing in the Vietnam War to appease the anti-war movement; the election was considered a tossup by election day.

Nixon managed to secure a close victory in the popular vote, with just over 500,000 votes (0.7%) separating him and Humphrey. In the Electoral College, Nixon's victory was larger; he carried the tipping-point state of Ohio by over 90,000 votes (2.3%), and his overall margin of victory in the Electoral College was 110 votes. No state shifted Democrat in this election, as the states either shifted towards Nixon or Wallace. Wallace remains the most recent third-party candidate (as of 2026) to carry any state in a presidential election. This was the first presidential election after the passage of the Voting Rights Act of 1965, which began restoring voting rights to Black Americans in the South, who had been disenfranchised for decades under Jim Crow. The 1968 election is often considered a major realigning election, as it permanently disrupted the Democratic New Deal Coalition that had dominated presidential politics since 1932.

== Background ==
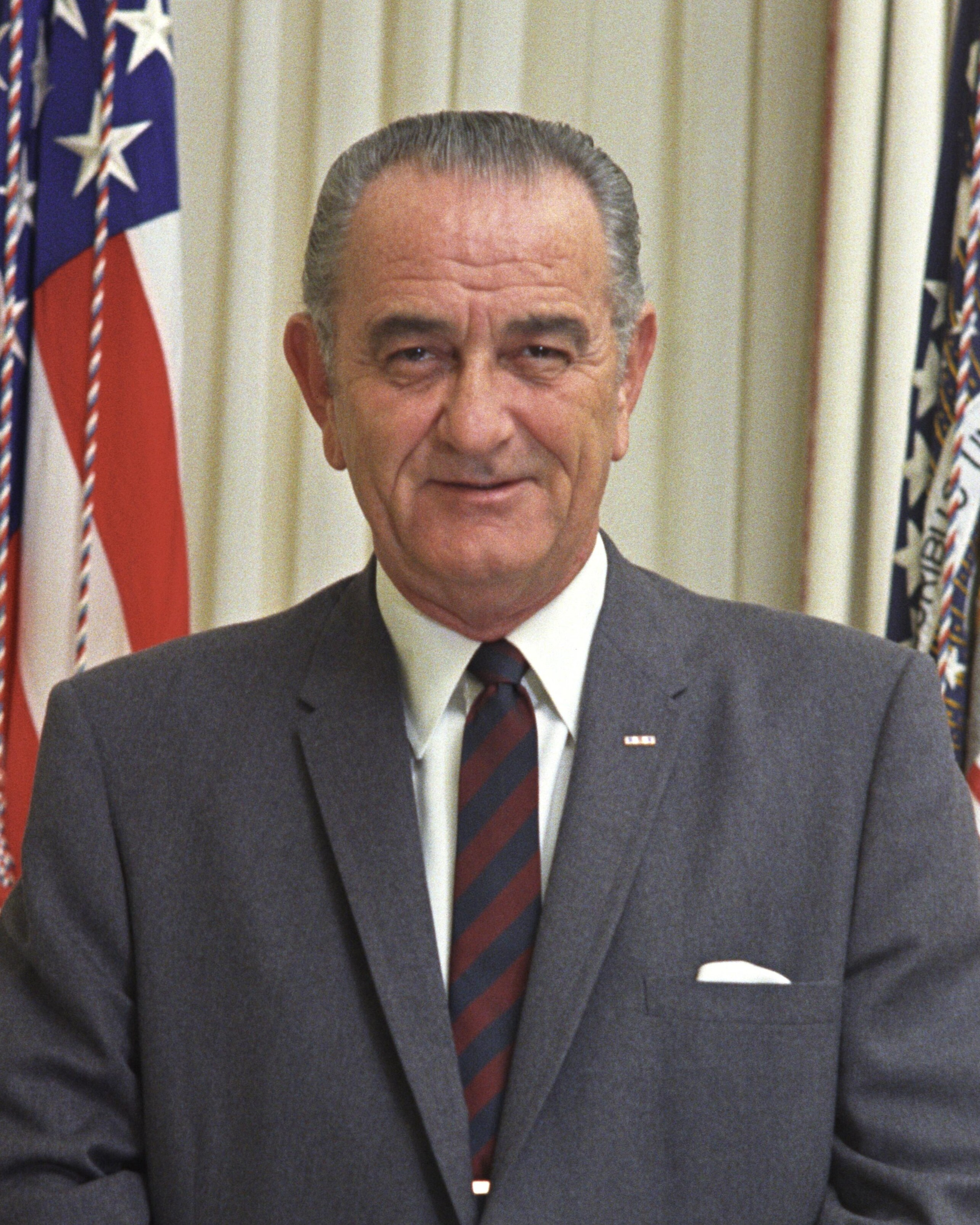
Lyndon B. Johnson, the incumbent president in 1968, whose second and only full term expired at noon on January 20, 1969

In the 1964 U.S. presidential election, incumbent Democratic President Lyndon B. Johnson won the largest popular vote landslide in U.S. presidential election history over Republican Senator Barry Goldwater. During the presidential term that followed, Johnson was able to achieve many political successes, including passage of his Great Society domestic programs (including War on Poverty legislation), landmark civil rights legislation, and the continued exploration of space. Despite these significant achievements, Johnson's popular support would be short-lived. Even as Johnson scored legislative victories, the country endured large-scale race riots in the streets of its larger cities, along with a generational revolt of young people and violent debates over foreign policy. The emergence of the hippie counter-culture, the rise of New Left activism, and the emergence of the Black Power movement exacerbated social and cultural clashes between classes, generations, and races. Adding to the national crisis, on April 4, 1968, civil rights movement leader Martin Luther King Jr. was assassinated in Memphis, Tennessee, igniting riots of grief and anger across the country. In Washington, D.C., rioting took place within a few blocks of the White House, and the government stationed soldiers with machine guns on the Capitol steps to protect it.

The Vietnam War was the primary reason for the precipitous decline of President Johnson's popularity. He had escalated U.S. commitment to the point that by late 1967 over 500,000 American soldiers were fighting in Vietnam. Draftees made up 42 percent of the military in Vietnam, but suffered 58% of the casualties, as nearly 1000 Americans a month were killed, and many more were injured. Resistance to the war rose as success seemed ever out of reach. The national news media began to focus on the high costs and ambiguous results of escalation, despite Johnson's repeated efforts to downplay the seriousness of the situation. In early January 1968, Secretary of Defense Robert McNamara said the war would be winding down, claiming that the North Vietnamese were losing their will to fight. Shortly thereafter, the North Vietnamese launched the Tet Offensive, in which they and Communist forces of Vietcong undertook simultaneous attacks on all government strongholds across South Vietnam. Although the uprising ended in a U.S. military victory, the scale of the Tet offensive led many Americans to question whether the war could be won, or was worth the costs to the United States. In addition, voters began to mistrust the government's assessment and reporting of the war effort. The Pentagon called for sending several hundred thousand more soldiers to Vietnam, while Johnson's approval ratings fell below 35%. The Secret Service refused to let the president visit American colleges and universities, and prevented him from appearing at the 1968 Democratic National Convention in Chicago, because it could not guarantee his safety.

== Republican Party nomination ==
Republican Party (United States) 1968 Republican Party ticket
Richard Nixon	Spiro Agnew
for President	for Vice President
36th Vice President of the United States (1953–1961)	55th Governor of Maryland (1967–1969)
Campaign

=== Other major candidates ===
The following candidates were frequently interviewed by major broadcast networks, were listed in publicly published national polls, or ran a campaign that extended beyond their flying home delegation in the case of favorite sons.

Nixon received 1,679,443 votes in the primaries.

Candidates in this section are sorted by date of withdrawal from the nomination race
Ronald Reagan	Nelson Rockefeller	Harold Stassen	George W. Romney
Governor of California (1967–1975)	Governor of New York (1959–1973)	Former president of the University of Pennsylvania (1948–1953)	Governor of Michigan (1963–1969)
Campaign	Campaign		Campaign
Lost nomination: August 8, 1968; 1,696,632 votes	Lost nomination: August 8, 1968; 164,340 votes	Lost nomination: August 8, 1968; 31,665 votes	Withdrew: February 28, 1968; 4,447 votes

=== Primaries ===
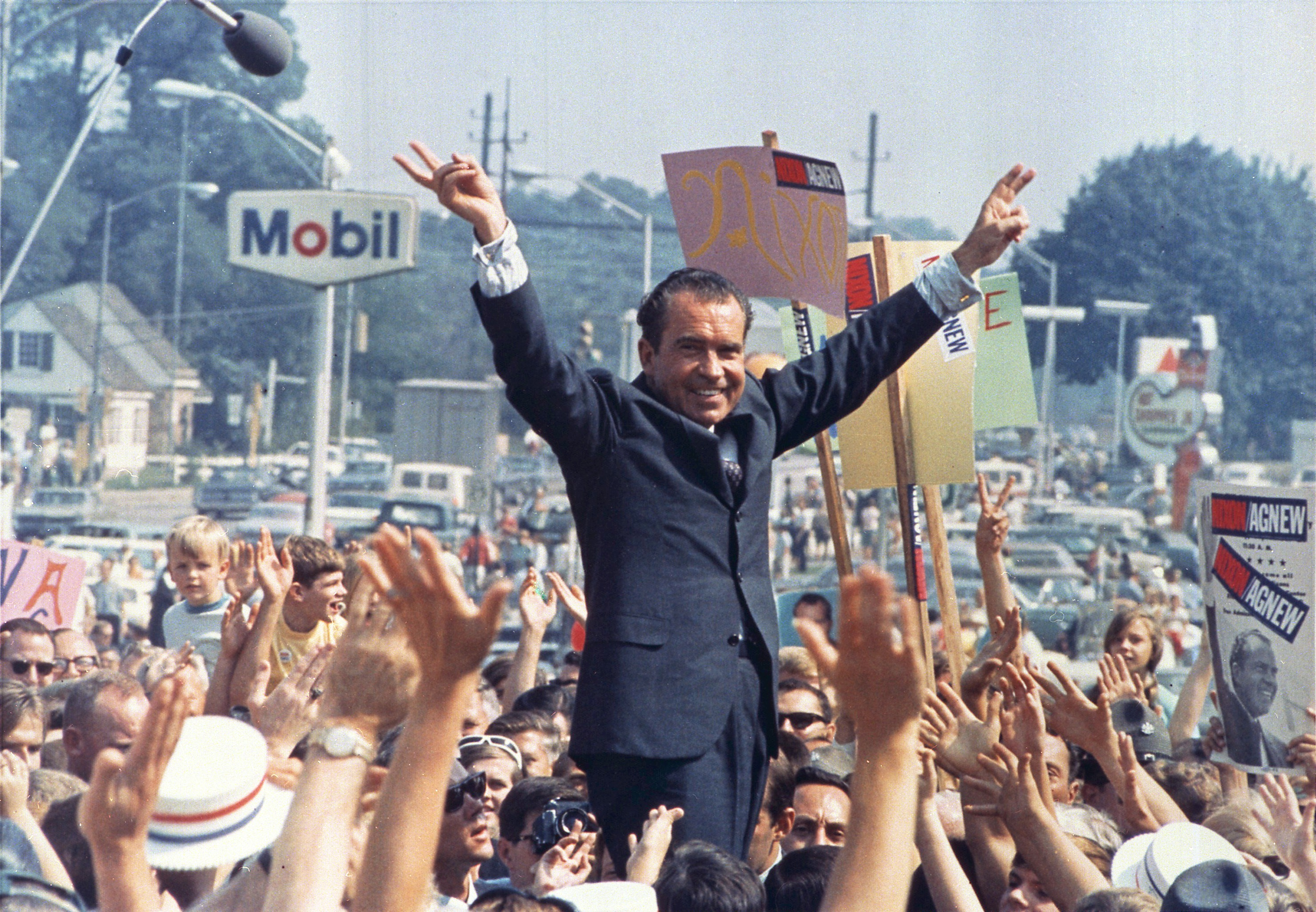
Richard Nixon campaign rally, July 1968

The front-runner for the Republican nomination was former Vice President Richard Nixon, who formally began campaigning in January 1968. Nixon had worked behind the scenes and was instrumental in Republican gains in Congress and governorships in the 1966 midterm elections. Thus, the party machinery and many of the new congressmen and governors supported him. Still, there was caution in the Republican ranks over Nixon, who had lost the 1960 election to John F. Kennedy and then lost the 1962 California gubernatorial election. Some hoped a more "electable" candidate would emerge. The story of the 1968 Republican primary campaign and nomination may be seen as one Nixon opponent after another entering the race and then dropping out. Nixon was the front runner throughout the contest because of his superior organization, and he easily defeated the rest of the field.

Nixon's first challenger was Michigan Governor George W. Romney. A Gallup poll in mid-1967 showed Nixon with 39%, followed by Romney with 25%. After a fact-finding trip to Vietnam, Romney told Detroit talk show host Lou Gordon that he had been "brainwashed" by the military and the diplomatic corps into supporting the Vietnam War; the remark led to weeks of ridicule in the national news media. Turning against American involvement in Vietnam, Romney planned to run as the anti-war Republican version of Eugene McCarthy. Following his "brainwashing" comment, Romney's support faded steadily; with polls showing him far behind Nixon, he withdrew from the race on February 28, 1968. Senator Charles Percy was considered another potential threat to Nixon, and had planned on waging an active campaign after securing a role as Illinois's favorite son. Later, however, Percy declined to have his name listed on the ballot for the Illinois presidential primary, as he no longer sought the presidential nomination.

Nixon won a resounding victory in the important New Hampshire primary on March 12, with 78% of the vote. Anti-war Republicans wrote in the name of New York governor Nelson Rockefeller, the de facto leader of the Republican Party's liberal wing, who received 11% of the vote and became Nixon's new challenger. Rockefeller had not originally intended to run, having discounted a campaign for the nomination in 1965, and planned to make U.S. Senator Jacob Javits, the favorite son, either in preparation of a presidential campaign or to secure him the second spot on the ticket. As Rockefeller warmed to the idea of entering the race, Javits shifted his effort to seeking a third term in the Senate. Nixon led Rockefeller in the polls throughout the primary campaign—though Rockefeller defeated Nixon and Governor John Volpe in the Massachusetts primary on April 30, he otherwise fared poorly in state primaries and conventions. He had declared too late to get his name placed on state primary ballots.

By early spring, California Governor Ronald Reagan, a leader of the Republican Party's conservative wing, had become Nixon's chief rival. In the Nebraska primary on May 14, Nixon won with 70% of the vote to 21% for Reagan and 5% for Rockefeller. While this was a wide margin for Nixon, Reagan remained Nixon's leading challenger. Nixon won the next primary of importance, Oregon, on May 15 with 65% of the vote, and won all the following primaries except for California (June 4), where only Reagan appeared on the ballot. Reagan's victory in California gave him a plurality of the nationwide primary vote, but his poor showing in most other state primaries left him far behind Nixon in the delegate count.

Total popular vote:

- Ronald Reagan: 1,696,632 (37.93%)
- Richard Nixon: 1,679,443 (37.54%)
- James A. Rhodes: 614,492 (13.74%)
- Nelson Rockefeller: 164,340 (3.67%)
- Unpledged: 140,639 (3.14%)
- Eugene McCarthy (write-in): 44,520 (1.00%)
- Harold Stassen: 31,655 (0.71%)
- John Volpe: 31,465 (0.70%)
- Others: 21,456 (0.51%)
- George Wallace (write-in): 15,291 (0.34%)
- Robert F. Kennedy (write-in): 14,524 (0.33%)
- Hubert Humphrey (write-in): 5,698 (0.13)
- Lyndon B. Johnson (write-in): 4,824 (0.11%)
- George W. Romney: 4,447 (0.10%)
- Raymond P. Shafer: 1,223 (0.03%)
- William Scranton: 724 (0.02%)
- Charles H. Percy: 689 (0.02%)
- Barry Goldwater: 598 (0.01%)
- John Lindsay: 591 (0.01%)

=== Republican Convention ===
As the 1968 Republican National Convention opened on August 5 in Miami Beach, Florida, the Associated Press estimated that Nixon had 656 delegate votes – 11 short of the number he needed to win the nomination. Reagan and Rockefeller were his only remaining opponents and they planned to unite their forces in a "stop-Nixon" movement. Because Goldwater had done well in the Deep South, delegates to the 1968 Republican National Convention included more Southern conservatives than in past conventions. There seemed potential for the conservative Reagan to be nominated if no victor emerged on the first ballot. Nixon narrowly secured the nomination on the first ballot, with the aid of South Carolina Senator Strom Thurmond, who had switched parties in 1964. He selected dark horse Maryland Governor Spiro Agnew as his running mate, a choice which Nixon believed would unite the party, appealing to both Northern moderates and Southerners disaffected with the Democrats. Nixon's first choice for running mate was reportedly his longtime friend and ally Robert Finch, who was the Lieutenant Governor of California at the time. Finch declined that offer, but later accepted an appointment as the Secretary of Health, Education, and Welfare in Nixon's administration. With Vietnam a key issue, Nixon had strongly considered tapping his 1960 running mate, Henry Cabot Lodge Jr., a former U.S. senator, ambassador to the UN, and ambassador twice to South Vietnam.

The Republican Convention Tally
President	(before switches)	(after switches)	Vice President	Vice-presidential votes
Richard Nixon	692	1238	Spiro Agnew	1119
Nelson Rockefeller	277	93	George W. Romney	186
Ronald Reagan	182	2	John V. Lindsay	10
Ohio governor James A. Rhodes	55	—	Massachusetts senator Edward Brooke	1
Michigan governor George W. Romney	50	—	James A. Rhodes	1
New Jersey senator Clifford Case	22	—	not voting	16
Kansas senator Frank Carlson	20	—	—	
Arkansas governor Winthrop Rockefeller	18	—	—	
Hawaii senator Hiram Fong	14	—	—	
Harold Stassen	2	—	—	
New York City mayor John V. Lindsay	1	—	—	

As of the 2020 presidential election, 1968 was the last time that two siblings (Nelson and Winthrop Rockefeller) ran against each other in a presidential primary.

== Democratic Party nomination ==
Democratic Party (United States) 1968 Democratic Party ticket
Hubert Humphrey	Edmund Muskie
for President	for Vice President
38th Vice President of the United States (1965–1969)	U.S. Senator from Maine (1959–1980)
Campaign

=== Other major candidates ===
The following candidates were frequently interviewed by major broadcast networks, were listed in publicly published national polls, or ran a campaign that extended beyond their home delegation in the case of favorite sons. Humphrey received 166,463 votes in the primaries.

Candidates in this section are sorted by date of withdrawal from the nomination race
Eugene McCarthy	George McGovern	Channing E. Phillips	Lester Maddox	Robert F. Kennedy	Lyndon B. Johnson
U.S. senator from Minnesota (1959–1971)	U.S. senator from South Dakota (1963–1981)	Reverend at Lincoln Temple from Washington, D.C.	Governor of Georgia (1967–1971)	U.S. senator from New York (1965–1968)	36th President of the United States (1963–1969)
Campaign	Campaign	Campaign		Campaign	Campaign
Lost nomination: August 29, 1968; 2,914,933 votes	Lost nomination: August 29, 1968; 0 votes	Lost nomination: August 29, 1968; 0 votes	Withdrew and endorsed George Wallace: August 28, 1968; 0 votes	Assassinated: June 5, 1968; 2,305,148 votes	Withdrew and endorsed Hubert Humphrey: March 31, 1968; 383,590 votes

=== Eugene McCarthy challenges Johnson ===
Because Lyndon B. Johnson had been elected to the presidency only once, in 1964, and had served less than two full years of the term before that, the Twenty-second Amendment did not disqualify him from running for another term. As a result, it was widely assumed when 1968 began that President Johnson would run for another term, and that he would have little trouble winning the Democratic nomination.

Despite growing opposition to Johnson's policies in Vietnam, it appeared that no prominent Democratic candidate would run against a sitting president of his own party. It was also accepted at the beginning of the year that Johnson's record of domestic accomplishments would overshadow public opposition to the Vietnam War and that he would easily boost his public image after he started campaigning. Even Senator Robert F. Kennedy from New York, an outspoken critic of Johnson's policies, with a large base of support, publicly declined to run against Johnson in the primaries. Poll numbers also suggested that a large share of Americans who opposed the Vietnam War felt the growth of the anti-war hippie movement among younger Americans and violent unrest on college campuses was not helping their cause. On January 30, however, claims by the Johnson administration that a recent troop surge would soon bring an end to the war were severely discredited when the Tet Offensive broke out. Although the American military was eventually able to fend off the attacks, and also inflict heavy losses among the communist opposition, the ability of the North Vietnamese Army and Viet Cong to launch large scale attacks during the Tet Offensive's long duration greatly weakened American support for the military draft and further combat operations in Vietnam. A recorded phone conversation which Johnson had with Chicago mayor Richard J. Daley on January 27 revealed that both men had become aware of Kennedy's private intention to enter the Democratic presidential primaries and that Johnson was willing to accept Daley's offer to run as Humphrey's vice presidential running mate if he were to end his re-election campaign. Daley, whose city would host the 1968 Democratic National Convention, also preferred either Johnson or Humphrey over any other candidate, and stated that Kennedy had met him the week before, and that he was unsuccessful in his attempt to win over Daley's support.

In time, only Senator Eugene McCarthy from Minnesota proved willing to challenge Johnson openly. Running as an anti-war candidate in the New Hampshire primary, McCarthy hoped to pressure the Democrats into publicly opposing the Vietnam War. Since New Hampshire was the first presidential primary of 1968, McCarthy poured most of his limited resources into the state. He was boosted by thousands of young college students, led by youth coordinator Sam Brown, who shaved their beards and cut their hair to be "Clean for Gene". These students organized get-out-the-vote drives, rang doorbells, distributed McCarthy buttons and leaflets, and worked hard in New Hampshire for McCarthy. On March 12, McCarthy won 42 percent of the primary vote, to Johnson's 49 percent, a shockingly strong showing against an incumbent president, which was even more impressive because Johnson had more than 24 supporters running for the Democratic National Convention delegate slots to be filled in the election, while McCarthy's campaign organized more strategically. McCarthy won 20 of the 24 delegates. This gave McCarthy's campaign legitimacy and momentum. Sensing Johnson's vulnerability, Senator Robert F. Kennedy announced his candidacy four days after the New Hampshire primary on March 16. Thereafter, McCarthy and Kennedy engaged in a series of state primaries.

=== Johnson withdraws ===
On March 31, 1968, following the New Hampshire primary and Kennedy's entry into the election, the president made a televised speech to the nation and said that he was suspending all bombing of North Vietnam in favor of peace talks. After concluding his speech, Johnson announced,

"With America's sons in the fields far away, with America's future under challenge right here at home, with our hopes and the world's hopes for peace in the balance every day, I do not believe that I should devote an hour or a day of my time to any personal partisan causes or to any duties, other than the awesome duties of this office — the presidency of your country. Accordingly, I shall not seek, and I will not accept, the nomination of my party for another term as your President."

Not discussed publicly at the time was Johnson's concern that he might not survive another term – Johnson's health was poor, and he had already suffered a serious heart attack in 1955. He died on January 22, 1973, two days after the end of the new presidential term. Bleak political forecasts also contributed to Johnson's withdrawal; internal polling by Johnson's campaign in Wisconsin, the next state to hold a primary election, showed him trailing badly. This was the second and until Joe Biden's withdrawal from the 2024 race most recent time an incumbent US president eligible to run withdrew from the presidential election.

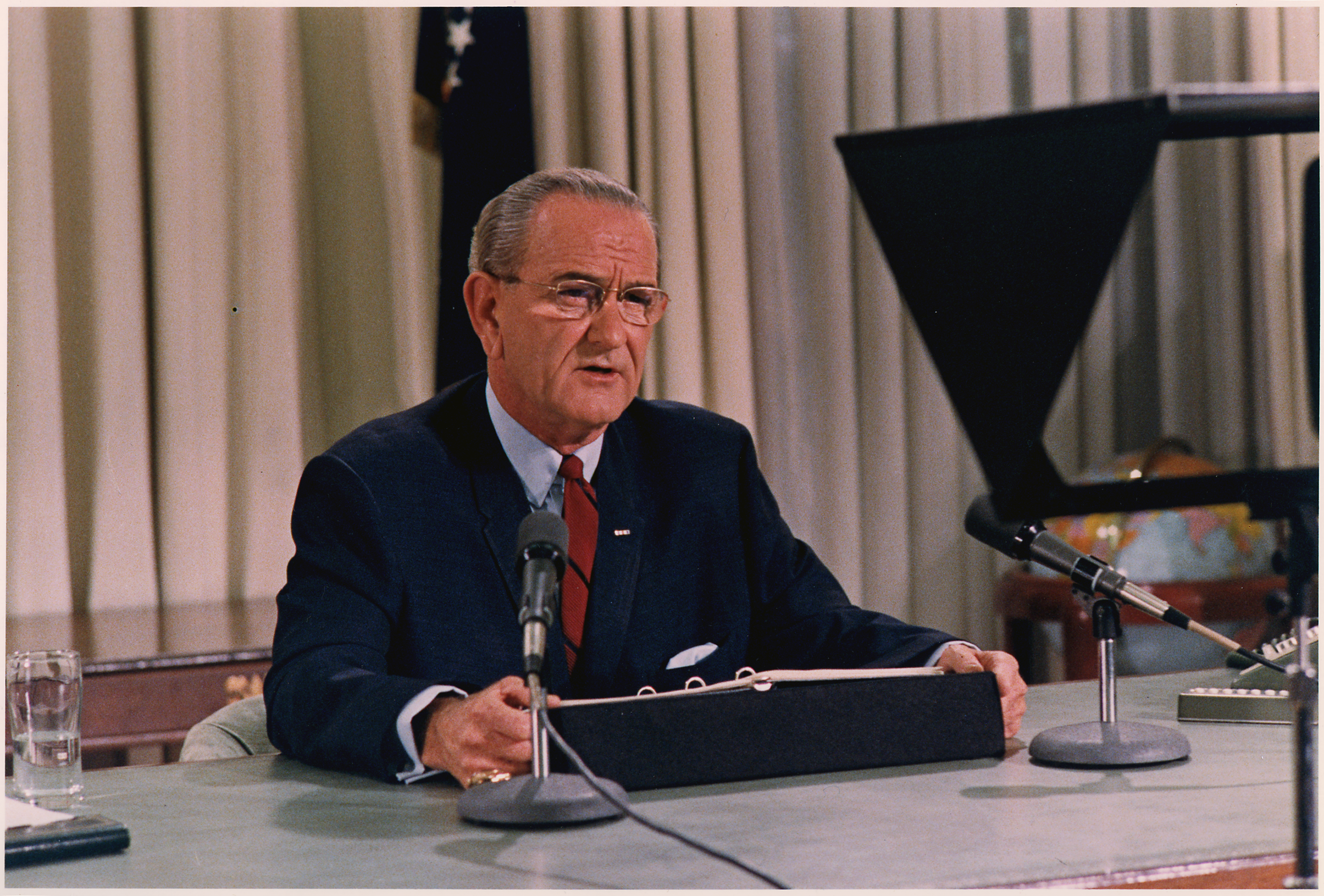
Johnson delivers a speech announcing his withdrawal on March 31

Historians have debated why Johnson quit a few days after his weak showing in New Hampshire. Jeff Shesol says Johnson wanted out of the White House, but also wanted vindication; when the indicators turned negative, he decided to leave. Lewis L. Gould says that Johnson had neglected the Democratic party, was hurting it by his Vietnam policies, and under-estimated McCarthy's strength until the last minute, when it was too late for Johnson to recover. Randall Bennett Woods said Johnson realized he needed to leave, for the nation to heal. Robert Dallek writes that Johnson had no further domestic goals, and realized that his personality had eroded his popularity. His health was poor, and he was pre-occupied with the Kennedy campaign; his wife was pressing for his retirement, and his base of support continued to shrink. Leaving the race would allow him to pose as a peace-maker. Anthony J. Bennett, however, said Johnson "had been forced out of a re-election race in 1968 by outrage over his policy in Southeast Asia".

In 2009, an AP reporter said that Johnson decided to end his re-election bid after CBS News anchor Walter Cronkite, who was influential, turned against the president's policy in Vietnam. During a CBS News editorial which aired on February 27, Cronkite recommended the US pursue peace negotiations. After watching Cronkite's editorial, Johnson allegedly exclaimed: "If I've lost Cronkite, I've lost Middle America." This quote by Johnson has been disputed for accuracy. Johnson was attending Texas Governor John Connally's birthday gala in Austin, Texas, when Cronkite's editorial aired and did not see the original broadcast. But, Cronkite and CBS News correspondent Bob Schieffer defended reports that the remark had been made. They said that members of Johnson's inner circle, who had watched the editorial with the president, including presidential aide George Christian and journalist Bill Moyers, later confirmed the accuracy of the quote to them. Schieffer, who was a reporter for the Star-Telegram's WBAP television station in Fort Worth, Texas, when Cronkite's editorial aired, acknowledged reports that the president saw the editorial's original broadcast were inaccurate, but claimed the president was able to watch a taping of it the morning after it aired and then made the remark. However, Johnson's January 27, 1968, phone conversation with Chicago Mayor Richard J. Daley revealed that the two were trying to feed Robert Kennedy's ego so he would stay in the race, convincing him that the Democratic Party was undergoing a "revolution". They suggested he might earn a spot as vice president.

After Johnson's withdrawal, the Democratic Party quickly split into four factions.

- The first faction consisted of labor unions and big-city party bosses (led by Chicago mayor Richard J. Daley). This group had traditionally controlled the Democratic Party since the days of President Franklin D. Roosevelt, and they feared loss of their control over the party. After Johnson's withdrawal, this group rallied to support Hubert Humphrey, Johnson's Vice President; it was also believed that Johnson himself was covertly supporting Humphrey, despite his public claims of neutrality.
- The second faction, which rallied behind Senator Eugene McCarthy, was composed of college students, intellectuals, and upper-middle-class urban Whites who had been the early activists against the war in Vietnam; they perceived themselves as the future of the Democratic Party.
- The third group was primarily composed of African Americans and Hispanic Americans, as well as some anti-war groups; these groups rallied behind Senator Robert F. Kennedy.
- The fourth group consisted of White Southern Democrats. Some older voters, remembering the New Deal's positive impact upon the rural South, supported Vice President Humphrey. Many would rally behind the third-party campaign of former Alabama Governor George Wallace as a "law and order" candidate.

Since the Vietnam War had become the major issue that was dividing the Democratic Party, and Johnson had come to symbolize the war for many liberal Democrats, Johnson believed that he could not win the nomination without a major struggle, and that he would probably lose the election in November to the Republicans. However, by withdrawing from the race, he could avoid the stigma of defeat, and he could keep control of the party machinery by giving the nomination to Humphrey, who had been a loyal vice president. Milne (2011) argues that, in terms of foreign-policy in the Vietnam War, Johnson at the end wanted Nixon to be president rather than Humphrey, since Johnson agreed with Nixon, rather than Humphrey, on the need to defend South Vietnam from communism. However, Johnson's telephone calls show that Johnson believed the Nixon camp was deliberately sabotaging the Paris peace talks. He told Humphrey, who refused to use allegations based on illegal wiretaps of a presidential candidate. Nixon himself called Johnson and denied the allegations. Dallek concludes that Nixon's advice to Saigon made no difference, and that Humphrey was so closely identified with Johnson's unpopular policies that no last-minute deal with Hanoi could have affected the election.

=== Contest ===
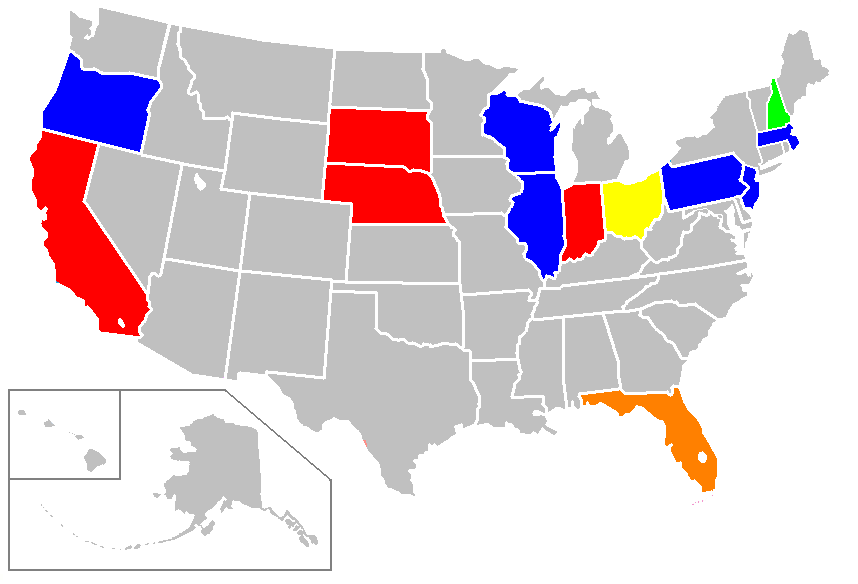
Statewide contest by winner: Red = Kennedy, Orange = Smathers, Yellow = Young, Green = Johnson, Blue = McCarthy, Grey = No primary Robert Kennedy George Smathers Stephen Young Lyndon Johnson Eugene McCarthy No primary

After Johnson's withdrawal, Vice President Hubert Humphrey announced his candidacy. Kennedy was successful in four state primaries (Indiana, Nebraska, South Dakota, and California), and McCarthy won six (Wisconsin, Pennsylvania, Massachusetts, Oregon, New Jersey, and Illinois). However, in primaries where they campaigned directly against one another, Kennedy won four primaries (Indiana, Nebraska, South Dakota, and California), and McCarthy won only one (Oregon). Humphrey did not compete in the primaries, leaving that job to favorite sons who were his surrogates, notably United States Senator George A. Smathers from Florida, United States Senator Stephen M. Young from Ohio, and Governor Roger D. Branigin of Indiana. Instead, Humphrey concentrated on winning the delegates in non-primary states, where party leaders such as Chicago Mayor Richard J. Daley controlled the delegate votes in their states. Kennedy defeated Branigin and McCarthy in the Indiana primary on May 7, and then defeated McCarthy in the Nebraska primary on May 14. However, McCarthy upset Kennedy in the Oregon primary on May 28.

After Kennedy's defeat in Oregon, the California primary was seen as crucial to both Kennedy and McCarthy. McCarthy stumped the state's many colleges and universities, where he was treated as a hero for being the first presidential candidate to oppose the war. Kennedy campaigned in the ghettos and barrios of the state's larger cities, where he was mobbed by enthusiastic supporters. Kennedy and McCarthy engaged in a television debate a few days before the primary; it was generally considered a draw. On June 4, Kennedy narrowly defeated McCarthy in California, 46%–42%. However, McCarthy refused to withdraw from the race, and made it clear that he would contest Kennedy in the upcoming New York primary on June 18, where McCarthy had much support from anti-war activists. In the early morning of June 5, after giving his victory speech in Los Angeles, Kennedy was shot by Sirhan Sirhan, a 24-year-old Palestinian-Jordanian, and died 26 hours later at Good Samaritan Hospital. Sirhan admitted his guilt, was convicted of murder, and is still in prison. In recent years some have cast doubt on Sirhan's guilt, including Sirhan himself, who said he was "brainwashed" into killing Kennedy and was a patsy.

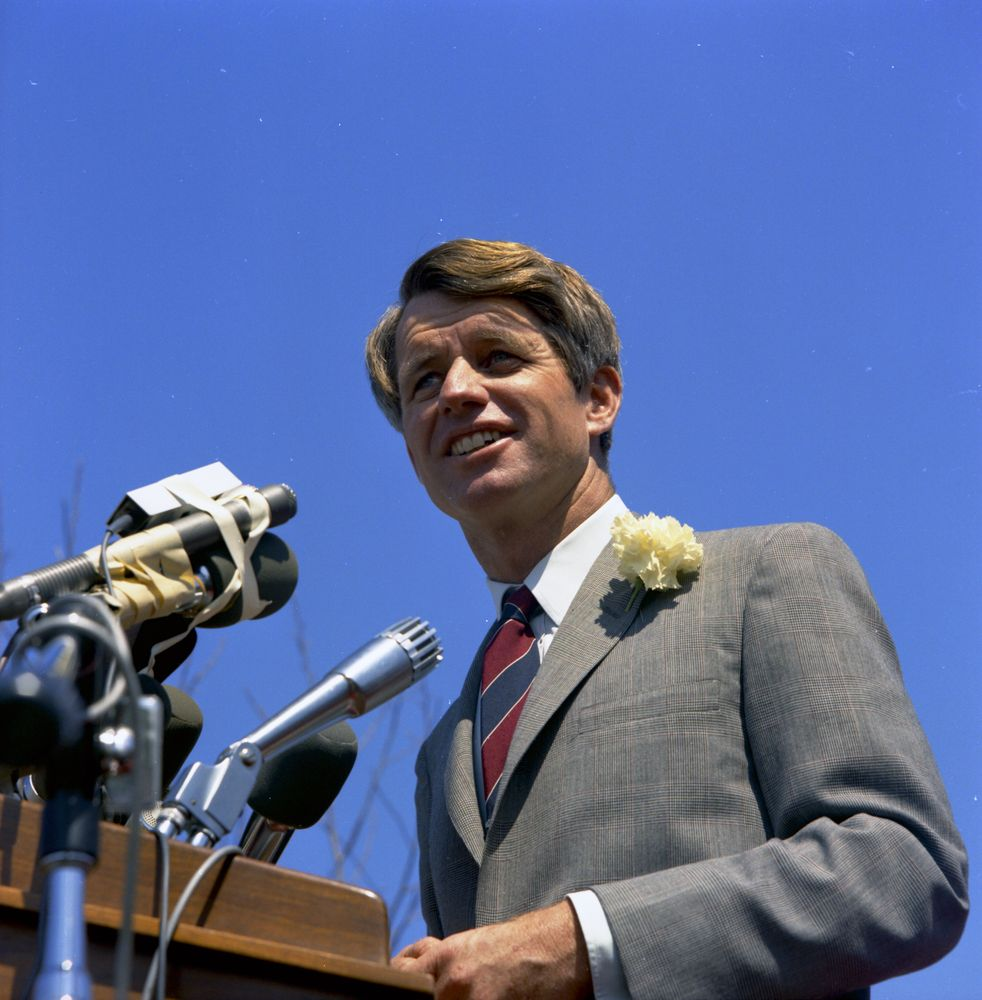
Kennedy campaigning in Los Angeles (photo courtesy of John F. Kennedy Presidential Library & Museum, Boston)

Political historians still debate whether Kennedy could have won the Democratic nomination, had he lived. Some historians, such as Theodore H. White and Arthur M. Schlesinger Jr., have argued that Kennedy's broad appeal and famed charisma would have convinced the party bosses at the Democratic Convention to give him the nomination. Jack Newfield, author of RFK: A Memoir, stated in a 1998 interview that on the night he was assassinated, "[Kennedy] had a phone conversation with Mayor Daley of Chicago, and Mayor Daley all but promised to throw the Illinois delegates to Bobby at the convention in August 1968. I think he said to me, and Pete Hamill: 'Daley is the ball game, and I think we have Daley.'" However, other writers such as Tom Wicker, who covered the Kennedy campaign for The New York Times, believe that Humphrey's large lead in delegate votes from non-primary states, combined with Senator McCarthy's refusal to quit the race, would have prevented Kennedy from ever winning a majority at the Democratic Convention, and that Humphrey would have been the Democratic nominee, even if Kennedy had lived. The journalist Richard Reeves and historian Michael Beschloss have both written that Humphrey was the likely nominee, and future Democratic National Committee chairman Larry O'Brien wrote in his memoirs that Kennedy's chances of winning the nomination had been slim, even after his win in California.

At the moment of RFK's death, the delegate totals were:

- Hubert Humphrey – 561
- Robert F. Kennedy – 393
- Eugene McCarthy – 258

Total popular vote:

- Eugene McCarthy: 2,914,933 (38.7%)
- Robert F. Kennedy: 2,304,542 (30.6%)
- Stephen M. Young: 549,140 (7.3%)
- Lyndon B. Johnson: 383,048 (5.1%)
- Roger D. Branigin: 238,700 (3.2%)
- George Smathers: 236,242 (3.1%)
- Hubert Humphrey: 166,463 (2.2%)
- Unpledged: 670,328 (8.9%)
- George Wallace: 33,520 (0.4%)
- Richard Nixon (write-in): 13,035 (0.2%)
- Nelson A. Rockefeller: 5,116 (0.1%)
- Ronald Reagan (write-in): 4,987 (0.1%)
- Ted Kennedy: 4,052 (0.1%)
- Others: 10,963 (0.1%)

=== Democratic Convention and antiwar protests ===
Robert Kennedy's death altered the dynamics of the race. Although Humphrey appeared the presumptive favorite for the nomination, thanks to his support from the traditional power blocs of the party, he was an unpopular choice with many of the anti-war elements within the party, who identified him with Johnson's controversial position on the Vietnam War. However, Kennedy's delegates failed to unite behind a single candidate who could have prevented Humphrey from getting the nomination. Some of Kennedy's support went to McCarthy, but many of Kennedy's delegates, remembering their bitter primary battles with McCarthy, refused to vote for him. Instead, these delegates rallied around the late-starting candidacy of Senator George McGovern of South Dakota, a Kennedy supporter in the spring primaries who had presidential ambitions himself. This division of the anti-war votes at the Democratic Convention made it easier for Humphrey to gather the delegates he needed to win the nomination.

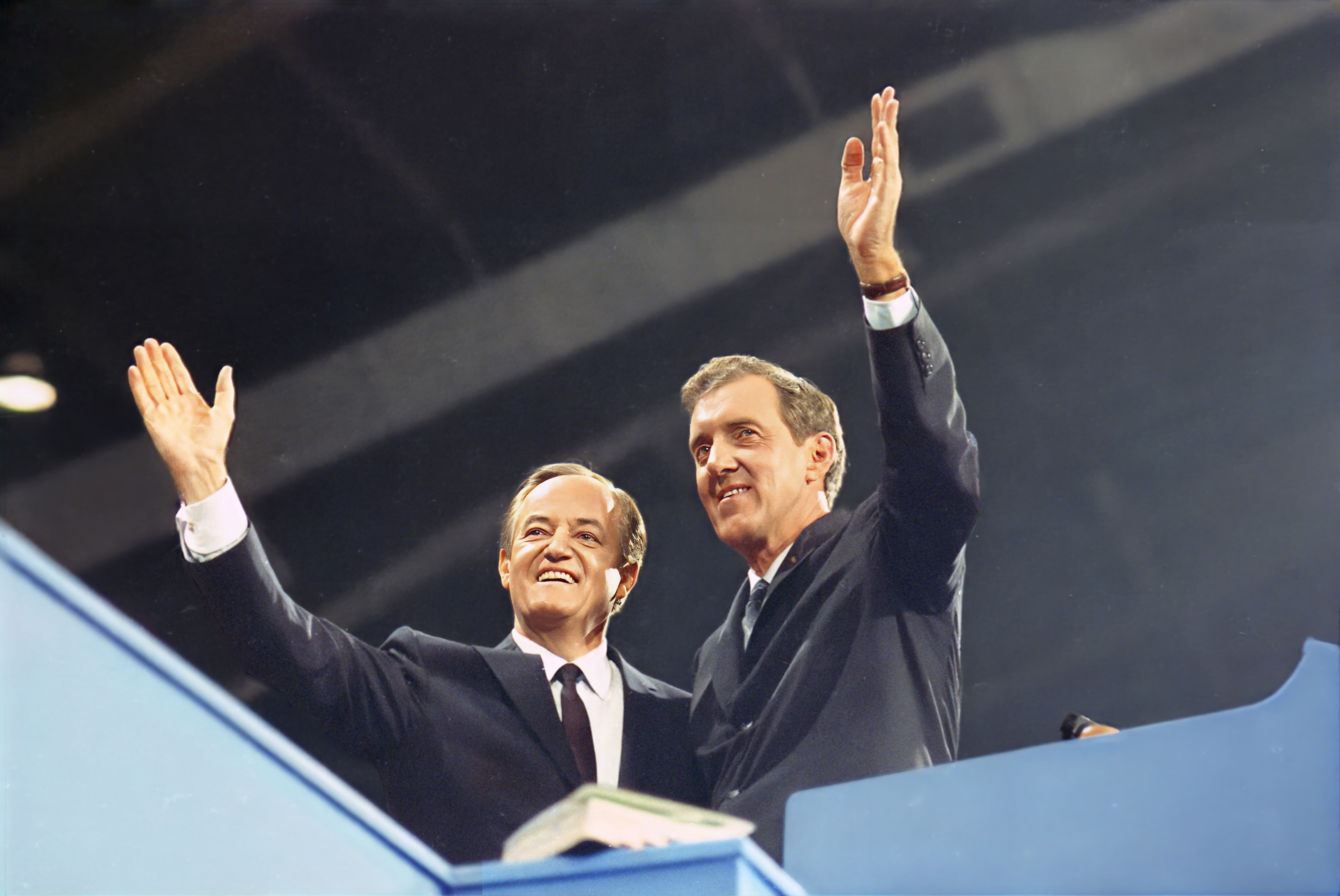
Vice President Hubert Humphrey and U.S. Senator Edmund Muskie wave from the podium at the 1968 Democratic National Convention in Chicago

When the 1968 Democratic National Convention opened in Chicago, thousands of young activists from around the nation gathered in the city to protest the Vietnam War. On the evening of August 28, in a clash which was covered on live television, Americans were shocked to see Chicago police brutally beating anti-war protesters in the streets of Chicago in front of the Conrad Hilton Hotel. While the protesters chanted, "The whole world is watching", the police used clubs and tear gas to beat back or arrest the protesters, leaving many of them bloody and dazed. The tear gas wafted into numerous hotel suites; in one of them Vice President Humphrey was watching the proceedings on television. The police said that their actions were justified because numerous police officers were being injured by bottles, rocks, and broken glass that were being thrown at them by the protestors. The protestors had also yelled insults at the police, calling them "pigs" and other epithets. The anti-war and police riot divided the Democratic Party's base: some supported the protestors and felt that the police were being heavy-handed, but others disapproved of the violence and supported the police. Meanwhile, the convention itself was marred by the strong-arm tactics of Chicago's mayor Richard J. Daley (who was seen on television angrily cursing Senator Abraham Ribicoff from Connecticut, who made a speech at the convention denouncing the excesses of the Chicago police). In the end, the nomination itself was anticlimactic, with Vice President Humphrey handily beating McCarthy and McGovern on the first ballot.

After the delegates nominated Humphrey, the convention then turned to selecting a vice-presidential nominee. The main candidates for this position were Senators Edward M. Kennedy from Massachusetts, Edmund Muskie from Maine, and Fred R. Harris from Oklahoma; Governors Richard Hughes of New Jersey and Terry Sanford of North Carolina; Mayor Joseph Alioto of San Francisco, California; former Deputy Secretary of Defense Cyrus Vance; and Ambassador Sargent Shriver from Maryland. Another idea floated was to tap Republican Governor Nelson Rockefeller of New York, one of the most liberal Republicans. Ted Kennedy was Humphrey's first choice, but the senator turned him down. After narrowing it down to Senator Muskie and Senator Harris, Vice President Humphrey chose Muskie, a moderate and environmentalist from Maine, for the nomination. The convention complied with the request and nominated Senator Muskie as Humphrey's running mate. Notably, Humphrey won votes from actual voters in primaries for his attempt to win the Democrat nomination, unlike Harris who only received delegates.

The publicity from the anti-war riots crippled Humphrey's campaign from the start, and it never fully recovered. Before 1968 the city of Chicago had been a frequent host for the political conventions of both parties; since 1968 only two national conventions have been held there: the Democratic convention of 1996, which nominated Bill Clinton for a second term, and the Democratic convention of 2024, which nominated Kamala Harris.

Balloting
Presidential tally		Vice Presidential tally	
Hubert Humphrey	1759.25	Edmund S. Muskie	1942.5
Eugene McCarthy	601	Not Voting	604.25
George S. McGovern	146.5	Julian Bond	48.5
Channing Phillips	67.5	David Hoeh	4
Daniel K. Moore	17.5	Edward M. Kennedy	3.5
Edward M. Kennedy	12.75	Eugene McCarthy	3.0
Paul W. "Bear" Bryant	1.5	Others	16.25
James H. Gray	0.5		
George Wallace	0.5		

Source: Keating Holland, "All the Votes... Really", CNN

=== Endorsements ===
Hubert Humphrey

- President Lyndon B. Johnson
- Mayor Richard J. Daley of Chicago
- Former President Harry S. Truman
- Singer/actor Frank Sinatra

Robert F. Kennedy

- Senator Abraham Ribicoff from Connecticut
- Senator George McGovern from South Dakota
- Senator Vance Hartke from Indiana
- Labor Leader Cesar Chavez
- Writer Truman Capote
- Writer Norman Mailer
- Actress Shirley MacLaine
- Actress Stefanie Powers
- Actor Robert Vaughn
- Actor Peter Lawford
- Singer Bobby Darin

Eugene McCarthy

- Representative Don Edwards from California
- Actor Paul Newman
- Actress Tallulah Bankhead
- Playwright Arthur Miller
- Writer William Styron

George McGovern (during convention)

- Senator Abraham Ribicoff from Connecticut
- Governor Harold E. Hughes of Iowa

== American Independent Party nomination ==
1968 American Independent Party ticket
George Wallace	Curtis LeMay
for President	for Vice President
45th Governor of Alabama (1963–1967)	Chief of Staff of the United States Air Force (1961–1965)
Campaign

The American Independent Party, which was established in 1967 by Bill and Eileen Shearer, nominated former Alabama Governor George Wallace – whose pro-racial segregation policies had been rejected by the mainstream of the Democratic Party – as the party's candidate for president. Much like the campaign of Strom Thurmond in the presidential election of 1948, the impact of the Wallace campaign was substantial, winning the electoral votes of several states in the Deep South. He appeared on the ballot in all fifty states, but not the District of Columbia. Although he did not come close to winning any states outside the South, Wallace was the 1968 presidential candidate who most disproportionately drew his support from among young men. Wallace also proved to be popular among blue-collar workers in the North and Midwest, and he took many votes which might have gone to Humphrey.

Wallace was not expected to win the election; his strategy was to prevent either major party candidate from winning a preliminary majority in the Electoral College. Although Wallace put considerable effort into mounting a serious general election campaign, his presidential bid was also a continuation of Southern efforts to elect unpledged electors that had taken place in every election from 1956 – he had his electors promise to vote not necessarily for him but rather for whomever he directed them to support – his objective was not to move the election into the U.S. House of Representatives where he would have had little influence, but rather to give himself the bargaining power to determine the winner. Wallace's running mate was retired four star General Curtis LeMay.

Prior to deciding on LeMay, Wallace gave serious consideration to former U.S. senator, governor, and Baseball Commissioner A. B. Happy Chandler of Kentucky as his running mate. Chandler and Wallace met a number of times; however, Chandler said that he and Wallace were unable to come to an agreement regarding their positions on racial matters. Chandler had supported the segregationist Dixiecrats in the 1948 presidential elections. However, after being re-elected Governor of Kentucky in 1955, he used National Guard troops to enforce school integration. Other considerations included ABC newscaster Paul Harvey of Oklahoma, former Secretary of Agriculture Ezra Taft Benson of Utah, former Governor of Arkansas Orval Faubus, and even Kentucky Fried Chicken founder Colonel Sanders.

Wallace's position of withdrawing from Vietnam, if the war was "not winnable within 90 days", was overshadowed by LeMay, implying he would use nuclear weapons to win the war.

=== Other parties and candidates ===
Also on the ballot in two or more states were black activist Eldridge Cleaver (who was ineligible to take office, as he would have only been 33 years of age on January 20, 1969) for the Peace and Freedom Party (nominated at the party's national convention); Henning Blomen for the Socialist Labor Party; Fred Halstead for the Socialist Workers Party; E. Harold Munn for the Prohibition Party; and Charlene Mitchell – the first African-American woman to run for president, and the first woman to receive valid votes in a general election – for the Communist Party. Comedians Dick Gregory and Pat Paulsen were notable write-in candidates. A facetious presidential candidate for 1968 was a pig named Pigasus, as a political statement by the Yippies, to illustrate their premise that "one pig's as good as any other".

== General election ==
Publisher	Date	Prediction
1964 result	Nov 3, 1964	D: 486, R: 52
1968 result	Nov 5, 1968	A: 45, D: 191, R: 301
Newsweek	Oct 27, 1968	A: 56, D: 46, R: 287, Tossup: 149
Associated Press	Oct 20, 1968	A: 45, D: 17, R: 222, Tossup: 154
N.Y. Times	Oct 6, 1968	A: 64, D: 28, R: 380, Tossup: 64
The Washington Post	Oct 6, 1968	A: 53, D: 46, R: 346, Tossup: 93
CBS	Oct 28, 1968	A: 58, D: 25, R: 270, Tossup: 185
CQ	Oct 25, 1968	A: 53, D: 32, R: 317, Tossup: 136

=== Polling aggregation ===
The following graph depicts the standing of each candidate in the poll aggregators from April 1968 to Election Day.

Richard Nixon Hubert Humphrey George Wallace

=== Polling ===
Poll source	Date(s) administered	Richard Nixon (R)	Hubert Humphrey (D)	George Wallace (AI)	Other	Undecided	Margin
Election Results	November 5, 1968	43.42%	42.72%	13.53%	0.33%	-	0.7
Harris	November 1, 1968 (Note: The publication date is used, as the dates of the survey were not given in the source.)	37%	40%	16%	-	7%	3
Gallup	Oct. 29-Nov. 1, 1968	42%	40%	14%	-	4%	2
Gallup	October 17–22, 1968	44%	36%	15%	-	5%	8
Harris	October 18, 1968	40%	35%	18%	-	7%	5
Gallup	September 19–24, 1968	43%	28%	21%	-	8%	15
Harris	September 23, 1968	39%	31%	21%	-	9%	8
Gallup	September 1–6, 1968	43%	31%	19%	-	7%	12
August 26–29: Democratic National Convention
Harris	August 27, 1968	40%	34%	17%	-	9%	6
Gallup	August 7–12, 1968	45%	29%	18%	-	8%	16
August 5–8: Republican National Convention
Harris	July 31, 1968	36%	41%	16%	-	7%	5
Crossley	July 31, 1968	39%	36%	19%	-	6%	3
Gallup	July 18–23, 1968	40%	38%	16%	-	6%	2
Harris	July 20, 1968	35%	37%	17%	-	11%	2
Gallup	Jun. 26-Jul. 1, 1968	35%	40%	16%	-	9%	5
Harris	June 24, 1968	36%	43%	13%	-	8%	7
Gallup	June 13–18, 1968	37%	42%	14%	-	7%	5
Gallup	May 23–28, 1968	36%	42%	14%	-	8%	6
Harris	May 23, 1968	37%	41%	14%	-	8%	4
Harris	May 6, 1968	36%	38%	13%	-	13%	2
Gallup	May 2–5, 1968	39%	36%	14%	-	11%	3
Gallup	April 4–9, 1968	43%	34%	9%	-	14%	9
Harris	April 6, 1968	34%	35%	12%	-	19%	1

=== Campaign strategies ===
Nixon developed a "Southern strategy" that was designed to appeal to conservative White southerners, who had traditionally voted Democratic, but were opposed to Johnson and Humphrey's support for the civil rights movement, as well as the rioting that had broken out in most large cities. Wallace, however, won over many of the voters Nixon targeted, especially in Goldwater-supporting Southern states, effectively splitting that voting bloc. Wallace deliberately targeted many states he had little chance of carrying himself in the hope that by splitting as many votes with Nixon as possible he would give competitive states to Humphrey and, by extension, boost his own chances of denying both opponents an Electoral College majority. Since he was well behind Nixon in the polls as the campaign began, Humphrey opted for a slashing, fighting campaign style. He repeatedly – and unsuccessfully – challenged Nixon to a televised debate, and he often compared his campaign to the successful underdog effort of President Harry Truman, another Democrat who had trailed in the polls, in the 1948 presidential election. Humphrey predicted that he, like Truman, would surprise the experts and win an upset victory.

=== Campaign themes ===
Nixon campaigned on a theme to restore "law and order", which appealed to many voters angry with the hundreds of violent riots that had taken place across the country in the previous few years. Following the assassination of Martin Luther King in April 1968, there was massive rioting in inner city areas. The police were overwhelmed and President Johnson decided to call out the U.S. Army. Nixon also opposed forced busing to desegregate schools. Proclaiming himself a supporter of civil rights, he recommended education as the solution rather than militancy. During the campaign, Nixon proposed government tax incentives to African Americans for small businesses and home improvements in their existing neighborhoods.

During the campaign, Nixon also used as a theme his opposition to the decisions of Chief Justice Earl Warren, pledging to "remake the Supreme Court." Many conservatives were critical of Chief Justice Warren for using the Supreme Court to promote liberal policies in the fields of civil rights, civil liberties, and the separation of church and state. Nixon promised that if he were elected president, he would appoint justices who would take a less-active role in creating social policy. In another campaign promise, he pledged to end the draft. During the 1960s, Nixon had been impressed by a paper he had read by Professor Martin Anderson of Columbia University. Anderson had argued in the paper for an end to the draft and the creation of an all-volunteer army. Nixon also saw ending the draft as an effective way to undermine the anti-Vietnam war movement, since he believed affluent college-age youths would stop protesting the war once their own possibility of having to fight in it was gone.

Humphrey, meanwhile, promised to continue and expand the Great Society welfare programs started by President Johnson, and to continue the Johnson Administration's War on Poverty. He also promised to continue the efforts of presidents Kennedy and Johnson, and the Supreme Court, in promoting the expansion of civil rights and civil liberties for minority groups. However, Humphrey also felt constrained for most of his campaign in voicing any opposition to the Vietnam War policies of President Johnson, due to his fear that Johnson would reject any peace proposals he made and undermine his campaign. As a result, early in his campaign Humphrey often found himself the target of anti-war protestors, some of whom heckled and disrupted his campaign rallies.

=== Humphrey's comeback and the October surprise ===
After the Democratic Convention in late August, Humphrey trailed Nixon by double digits in most polls, and his chances seemed hopeless, with some polls predicting a margin of victory for Nixon as high as 16% as late as August. Many within Humphrey's campaign saw their real goal as avoiding the potential humiliation of finishing behind Wallace in the Electoral College vote (if not necessarily the popular vote), rather than having any serious chance of defeating Nixon. According to Time magazine, "The old Democratic coalition was disintegrating, with untold numbers of blue-collar workers responding to Wallace's blandishments, Negroes threatening to sit out the election, liberals disaffected over the Vietnam War, the South lost. The war chest was almost empty, and the party's machinery, neglected by Lyndon Johnson, creaked in disrepair." Calling for "the politics of joy", and using the still-powerful labor unions as his base, Humphrey fought back. To distance himself from Johnson, and to take advantage of the Democratic plurality in voter registration, Humphrey stopped being identified in ads as "Vice President Hubert Humphrey", instead being labelled "Democratic candidate Hubert Humphrey".

Humphrey attacked Wallace as a racist bigot who appealed to the darker impulses of Americans. Wallace had been rising in the polls as a result of tailoring his message to audiences outside of his southern strongholds by using anti-establishment rhetoric and attacks on "concentrated wealth", with Wallace's polling numbers peaking at 21% nationally in late September and early October. However, Wallace's momentum went into reverse after he selected Curtis LeMay as his running mate. Curtis LeMay's suggestion of using tactical nuclear weapons in Vietnam conjured up the worst memories of the 1964 Goldwater campaign. Labor unions also undertook a major effort to win back union members who were supporting Wallace, with some substantial success. Polling numbers that had shown Wallace winning almost one-half of union members in the summer of 1968 went increasingly into sharp decline as the election campaign progressed into the fall up to early November election day. As election day approached and Wallace's support in the North, Midwest and West began to wane, Humphrey finally began to climb in the polls.

In October, Humphrey — who was rising sharply in the polls due to the decline of Wallace — began to distance himself publicly from the Johnson administration on the Vietnam War, calling for a bombing halt. The key turning point for Humphrey's campaign came when President Johnson officially announced a bombing halt, and even a possible peace deal, the weekend before the election. The "Halloween Peace" gave Humphrey's campaign a badly needed boost. In addition, Senator Eugene McCarthy finally endorsed a vote for Humphrey in late October after previously refusing to do so, and by election day the polls were reporting a dead heat.

=== Possible sabotage of peace talks ===
The Nixon campaign had anticipated a possible "October surprise", a peace agreement produced by the Paris negotiations; as such an agreement would be a boost to Humphrey, Nixon thwarted any last-minute chances of a "Halloween Peace". Nixon told campaign aide and his future White House Chief of Staff H. R. Haldeman to put a "monkey wrench" into an early end to the war. Johnson was enraged and said that Nixon had "blood on his hands", and that Senate Minority Leader Everett Dirksen agreed with Johnson that such action was "treason". Defense Secretary Clark Clifford considered the moves an illegal violation of the Logan Act. A former director of the Nixon Library called it a "covert action" which "laid the skulduggery of his presidency".

Bryce Harlow, former Eisenhower White House staff member, claimed to have "a double agent working in the White House... I kept Nixon informed." Harlow and Nixon's future National Security Advisor and Secretary of State Henry Kissinger, who was friendly with both campaigns and guaranteed a job in either a Humphrey or Nixon administration, separately predicted Johnson's "bombing halt": "The word is out that we are making an effort to throw the election to Humphrey. Nixon has been told of it", Democratic senator George Smathers informed Johnson.

Nixon asked Anna Chennault to be his "channel to Mr. Thieu" to advise him to refuse participation in the talks, in what is sometimes described as the "Anna Chennault Affair". Thieu was promised a better deal under a Nixon administration. Chennault agreed and periodically reported to John Mitchell that Thieu had no intention of attending a peace conference. On November 2, Chennault informed Bùi Diễm, the South Vietnamese ambassador: "I have just heard from my boss in Albuquerque who says his boss [Nixon] is going to win. And you tell your boss [Thieu] to hold on a while longer." In 1997, Chennault admitted that, "I was constantly in touch with Nixon and Mitchell". The effort also involved Texas Senator John Tower and Kissinger, who traveled to Paris on behalf of the Nixon campaign. William Bundy stated that Kissinger obtained "no useful inside information" from his trip to Paris, and "almost any experienced Hanoi watcher might have come to the same conclusion". While Kissinger may have "hinted that his advice was based on contacts with the Paris delegation", this sort of "self-promotion ... is at worst a minor and not uncommon practice, quite different from getting and reporting real secrets".

Johnson learned of the Nixon-Chennault effort because the NSA was intercepting communications in Vietnam. In response, Johnson ordered NSA surveillance of Chennault and wire-tapped the South Vietnamese embassy and members of the Nixon campaign. He did not leak the information to the public because he did not want to "shock America" with the revelation, nor reveal that the NSA was intercepting communications in Vietnam. Johnson did make information available to Humphrey, but at this point Humphrey thought he was going to win the election, so he did not reveal the information to the public. Humphrey later regretted this as a mistake. The South Vietnamese government withdrew from peace negotiations, and Nixon publicly offered to go to Saigon to help the negotiations. A promising "peace bump" ended up in "shambles" for the Democratic Party. The claim of sabotage of peace talks between the United States and South Vietnam from Nixon has been disputed by historian Luke Nichter in his 2023 book The Year That Broke Politics: Collusion and Chaos in the Presidential Election of 1968.

=== Election ===
The election on November 5, 1968, proved to be extremely close, and it was not until the following morning that the television news networks were able to declare Nixon the winner. The key states proved to be California, Illinois and Ohio, all of which Nixon won by three percentage points or less. Had Humphrey carried all three of these states, he would have won the election. Had he carried only two of them or just California among them, George Wallace would have succeeded in his aim of preventing an Electoral College majority for any candidate, and the decision would have been given to the House of Representatives, at the time controlled by the Democratic Party. Nixon won the popular vote with a plurality of 512,000 votes, or a victory margin of about one percentage point. In the Electoral College, Nixon's victory was much larger, as he carried 32 states with 301 electoral votes, compared to Humphrey's 13 states and 191 electoral votes and Wallace's five states and 46 electoral votes.

Richard Nixon was able to win the Electoral College, dominating several regions in the Western United States, Midwest, Upland South, and portions of the Northeast, while winning the popular vote by a relatively small 511,944 votes over Democratic nominee Hubert Humphrey. Democratic nominee Hubert Humphrey performed relatively well in the Northeast and Upper Midwest. Wallace finished last with five states in the Deep South; he is the most recent third-party candidate to win any states. This was the first time that the Republican nominee won the popular vote with a margin of under 5 points since 1896, something that would not be seen again until 2004.

Out of all the states that Nixon had previously carried in 1960, Maine and Washington were the only two states that did not vote for Nixon again in 1968, although Nixon would carry them four years later during his re-election campaign in 1972. He also carried eight states that voted for John F. Kennedy in 1960: Illinois, New Jersey, Missouri, North Carolina, South Carolina, New Mexico, Nevada and Delaware. This was the last time until 1988 that the state of Washington voted Democratic and until 1992 that Connecticut, Maine, and Michigan voted Democratic in the general election. Nixon was also the last Republican candidate to win a presidential election without carrying Alabama, Arkansas, Louisiana, Mississippi, and Texas. This is the first time which the Republican candidate captured the White House without carrying Michigan, Minnesota, Maine and Pennsylvania. He would be the last Republican candidate to carry Minnesota (four years later, in 1972), as of 2024. This is also the first time since 1916 that Minnesota voted for the candidate who did not eventually win.

Remarkably, Nixon won the election despite winning only two of the six states (Arizona and South Carolina) won by Republican Barry Goldwater four years earlier. He remains the only presidential candidate to win in spite of defending such a low number of his own party's states. All of the remaining four states carried by Goldwater were carried by Wallace in 1968. They would be won by Nixon in 1972. Four of the fives states won by Wallace had voted for Goldwater. Of the 3,130 counties/districts/independent cities making returns, Nixon won in 1,859 (59.39%) while Humphrey carried 693 (22.14%). Wallace was victorious in 578 counties (18.47%), all of which (with one exception of Pemiscot County, Missouri) were located in the South. Nixon said that Humphrey left a gracious message congratulating him, noting, "I know exactly how he felt. I know how it feels to lose a close one."

== Results ==
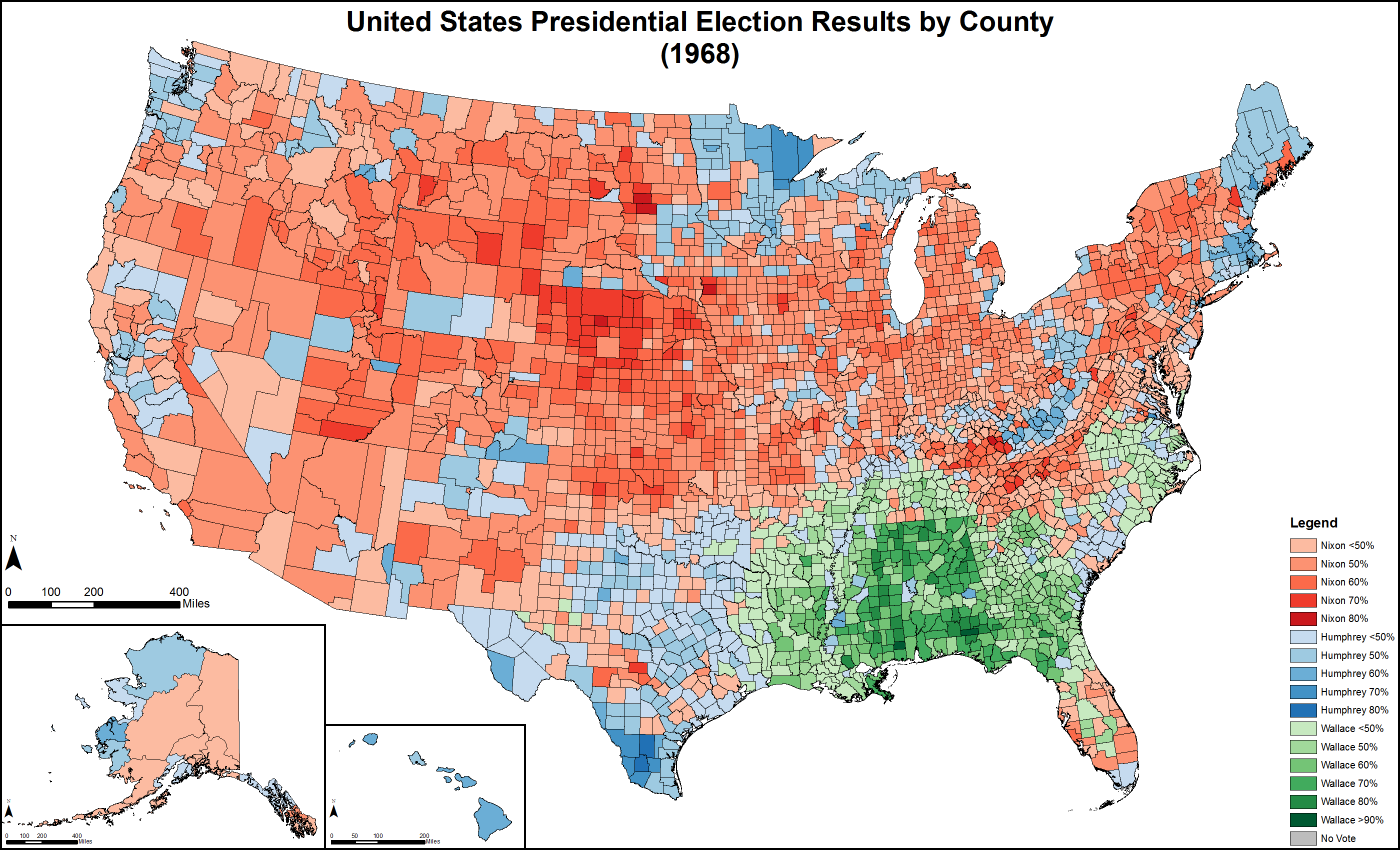
Election results by county Richard Nixon Hubert Humphrey George Wallace

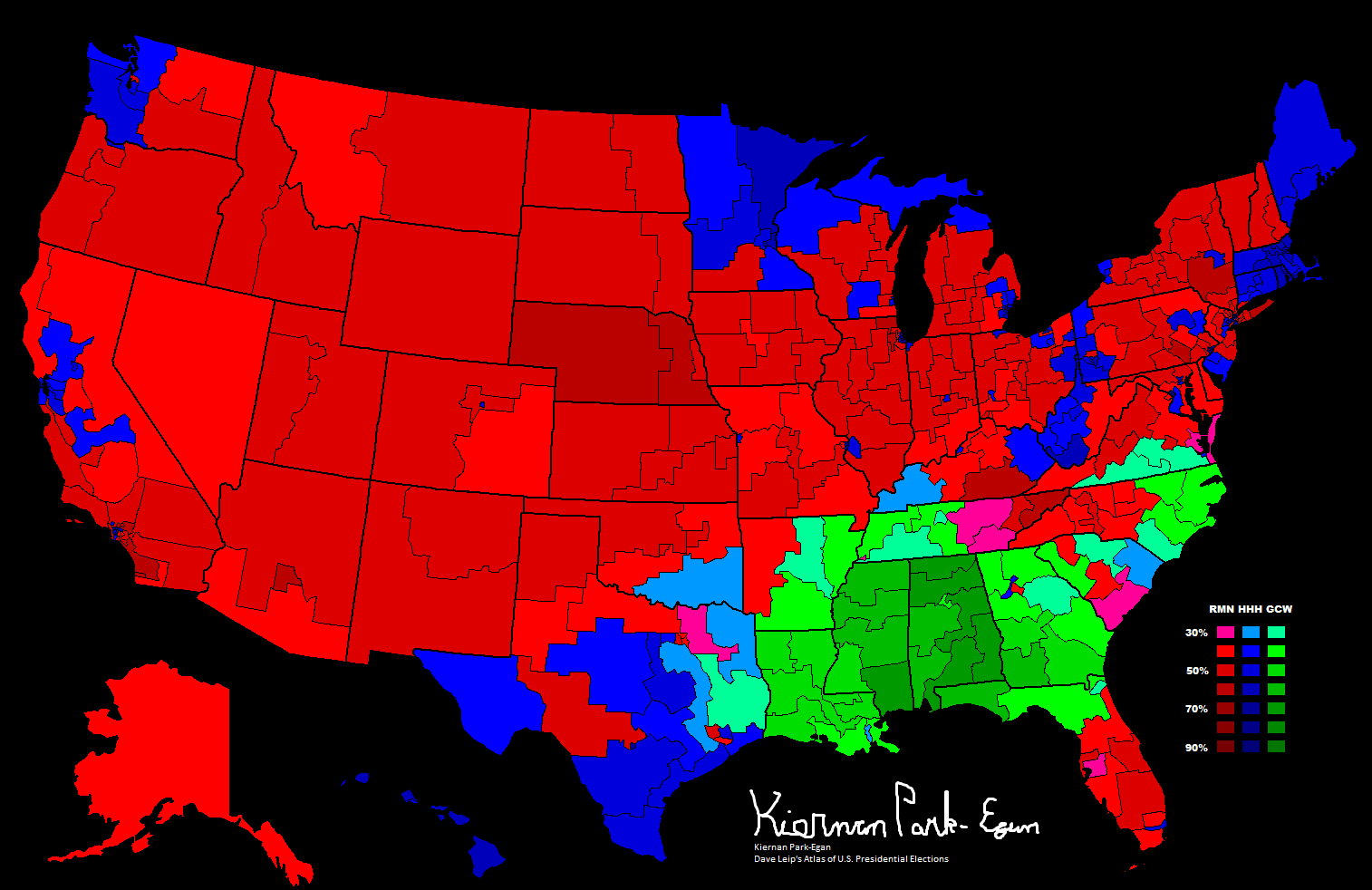
Results by congressional district

Nixon's victory is often considered a realigning election in American politics. From 1932 to 1964, the Democratic Party was undoubtedly the majority party, winning seven out of nine presidential elections, and their agenda influenced policies undertaken by the Republican Eisenhower administration. The 1968 election reversed the situation completely. From 1968 until 2004, Republicans won seven out of ten presidential elections, and its policies demonstrably affected those enacted by the Democratic Clinton administration via the Third Way.

The election was a seismic event in the long-term realignment in Democratic Party support, especially in the South. Nationwide, the bitter splits over civil rights, the new left, the Vietnam War, and other "culture wars" were slow to heal. Democrats could no longer count on White Southern support for the presidency, as Republicans made major gains in suburban areas and areas filled with Northern migrants. The rural Democratic "courthouse cliques" in the South lost power. While Democrats controlled local and state politics in the South, Republicans usually won the presidential vote. Some estimates suggest that Humphrey won less than ten percent of the white vote in the former Confederacy, although other sources have placed this figure closer to twenty percent. Nevertheless, there is little doubt that a majority of Humphreyʼs support in the former Confederacy came from black voters, who were now voting in full force.

From 1968 until 2004, only two Democrats were elected president, both native Southerners – Jimmy Carter of Georgia and Bill Clinton of Arkansas, both of whom won several states in the region. Other Democratic presidential candidates since 1968 have performed very poorly in former confederate states. Virginia has consistently voted Democratic since 2008, after voting Republican from 1968 to 2004. But all Democratic presidential candidates since 2000 combined have only won Florida twice, and North Carolina and Georgia once. The elections in which Democrats Barack Obama and Joe Biden won these states are also the only other times the party has won the presidency since 1968. No Democrat has ever been elected president without carrying at least one of Georgia or Florida.

Another important result of this election was that it led to several reforms in how the Democratic Party chose its presidential nominees. In 1969, the McGovern–Fraser Commission adopted a set of rules for the states to follow in selecting convention delegates. These rules reduced the influence of party leaders on the nominating process and provided greater representation for minorities, women, and youth. The reforms led most states to adopt laws requiring primary elections, instead of party leaders, to choose delegates.

After 1968, the only way to win the party's presidential nomination became through the primary process; Humphrey was the last nominee of either major party until Kamala Harris in 2024 to win their party's nomination without having directly competed in the primaries. Until Biden withdrew from the race in 2024, this remained the most recent presidential election in which the incumbent president was eligible to run again but was not the eventual nominee of their party. It is also the last election in which any third-party candidate won an entire state's electoral votes, with Wallace carrying five states. Nixon also became the first non-incumbent vice president to be elected president, something that would not happen again until 2020.

This is one of two times in American history that a former vice president and an incumbent vice president were major party nominees, after 1800. (Note: Incumbent president John Adams (a former vice president) ran against incumbent vice president Thomas Jefferson, who defeated Adams and won the election.) As of 2024, this is the last time that all 50 states and the District of Columbia would vote under a winner-take-all system. Maine would begin allocating its electoral votes by congressional district in 1972 and Nebraska would begin doing the same in 1992.

This was the first time since 1928 that North Carolina voted for a Republican, and the first since 1912 (only the second and final time since 1852) that Maine and Vermont did not support the same party. Similarly, it is the second of two times that Oregon and Washington did not support the same party since 1920 (the other being in 1948). This was the penultimate time Texas voted Democratic, and the last time it voted for a Democrat who lost the presidential election.

Nixon was the first Republican to win the presidency without Michigan and Pennsylvania, these feats reprised by George W. Bush in 2000 and 2004.

By losing New York, Nixon became the third victorious candidate to lose his home state, which also occurred in 1844, 1916, and 2016. This election and 1916 are the only times a winning presidential and vice-presidential each lost their home state. This is also, as of 2025, the most recent election apart from 2016 (in which both major party nominees were registered in the same state) in which the winner of the electoral college won without winning their home state.

Despite the narrow (0.7%) difference in the popular vote, Humphrey took only 35.5% of the electoral vote. This disparity prompted the introduction of the Bayh–Celler amendment in Congress, which would have replaced the Electoral College with a direct election of the presidency. The effort was not successful, and the Electoral College is still in force. Nixon was the first Republican to win only a plurality of the popular vote since 1880; he was the last winning presidential candidate until Bill Clinton in 1992 to do so, and the last winning Republican until Donald Trump in 2024 to do so. Nixon was also the last presidential candidate until Trump in 2024 to successfully make a political comeback by winning an election after losing a previous one.

Electoral results
Presidential candidate	Party	Home state	Popular vote		Electoral vote	Running mate		
Presidential candidate	Party	Home state	Count	Percentage	Electoral vote	Vice-presidential candidate	Home state	Electoral vote
Richard Nixon	Republican	New York	31,783,783	43.42%	301	Spiro Agnew	Maryland	301
Hubert Humphrey	Democratic	Minnesota	31,271,839	42.72%	191	Edmund Muskie	Maine	191
George Wallace	American Independent	Alabama	9,901,118	13.53%	46 (Note: A North Carolina faithless Republican elector voted for Wallace/LeMay)	Curtis LeMay	California	46 (Note: A North Carolina faithless Republican elector voted for Wallace/LeMay)
Other			243,259	0.33%	—	Other		—
Total			73,199,999	100%	538			538
Needed to win					270			270

Source (Popular Vote): Leip, David. "1968 Presidential Election Results". Dave Leip's Atlas of U.S. Presidential Elections. Source (Electoral Vote): "Electoral College Box Scores 1789–1996". National Archives and Records Administration.

Popular vote
Nixon	43.42%
Humphrey	42.72%
Wallace	13.53%
Others	0.33%

Electoral vote
Nixon	55.95%
Humphrey	35.50%
Wallace	8.55%

=== Geography of results ===
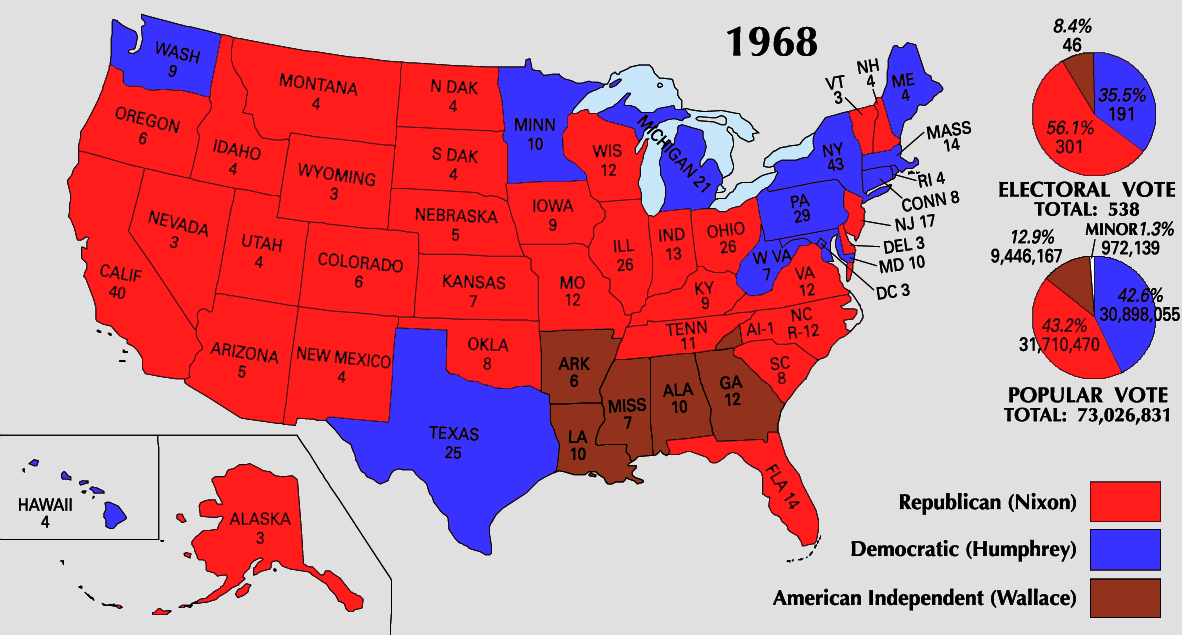

Results by state, shaded according to winning candidate's percentage of the vote

Results by county, shaded according to winning candidate's percentage of the vote

Results by district, shaded according to winning candidate's percentage of the vote

==== Cartographic gallery ====
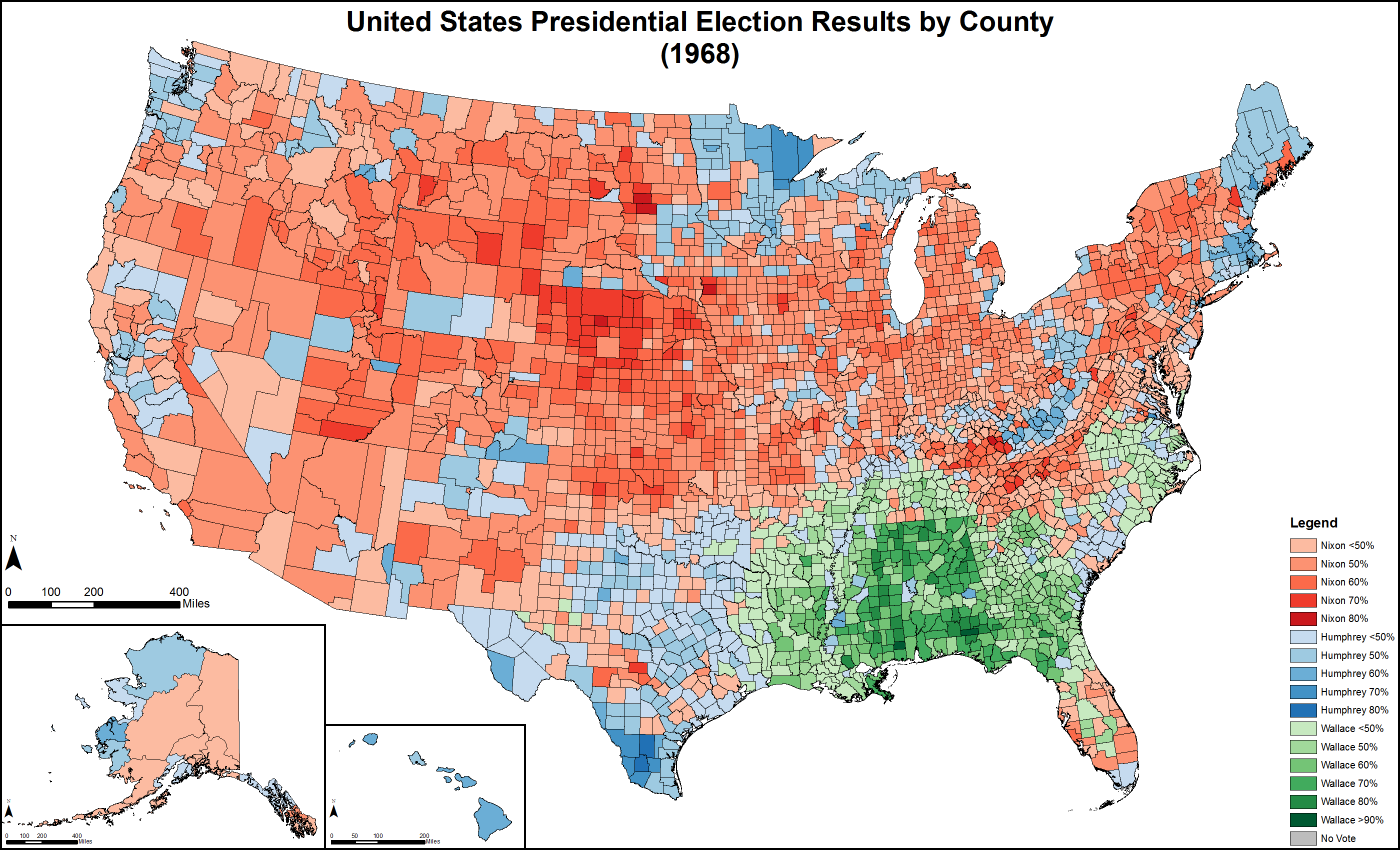
Presidential election results by county

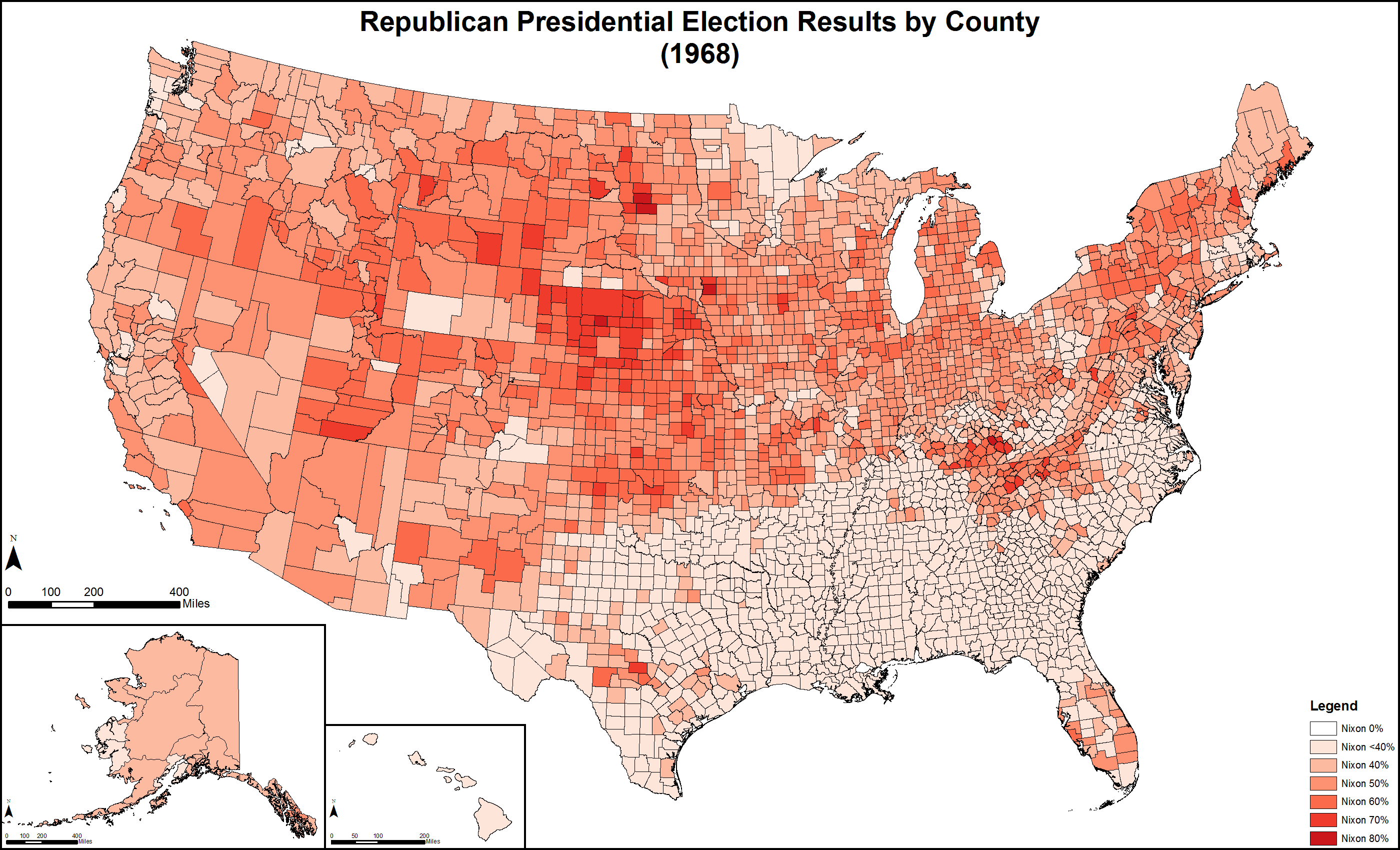
Republican presidential election results by county

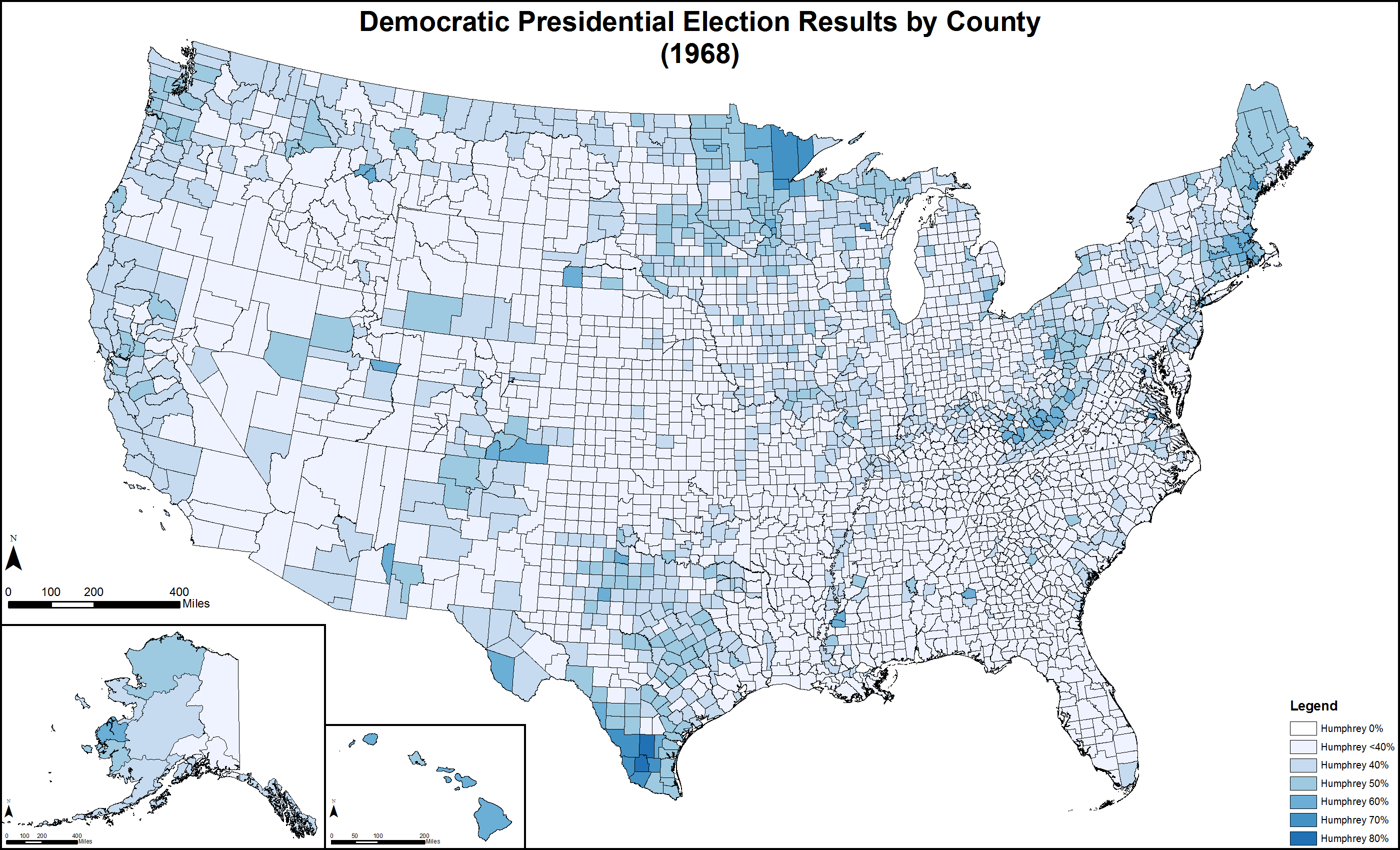
Democratic presidential election results by county

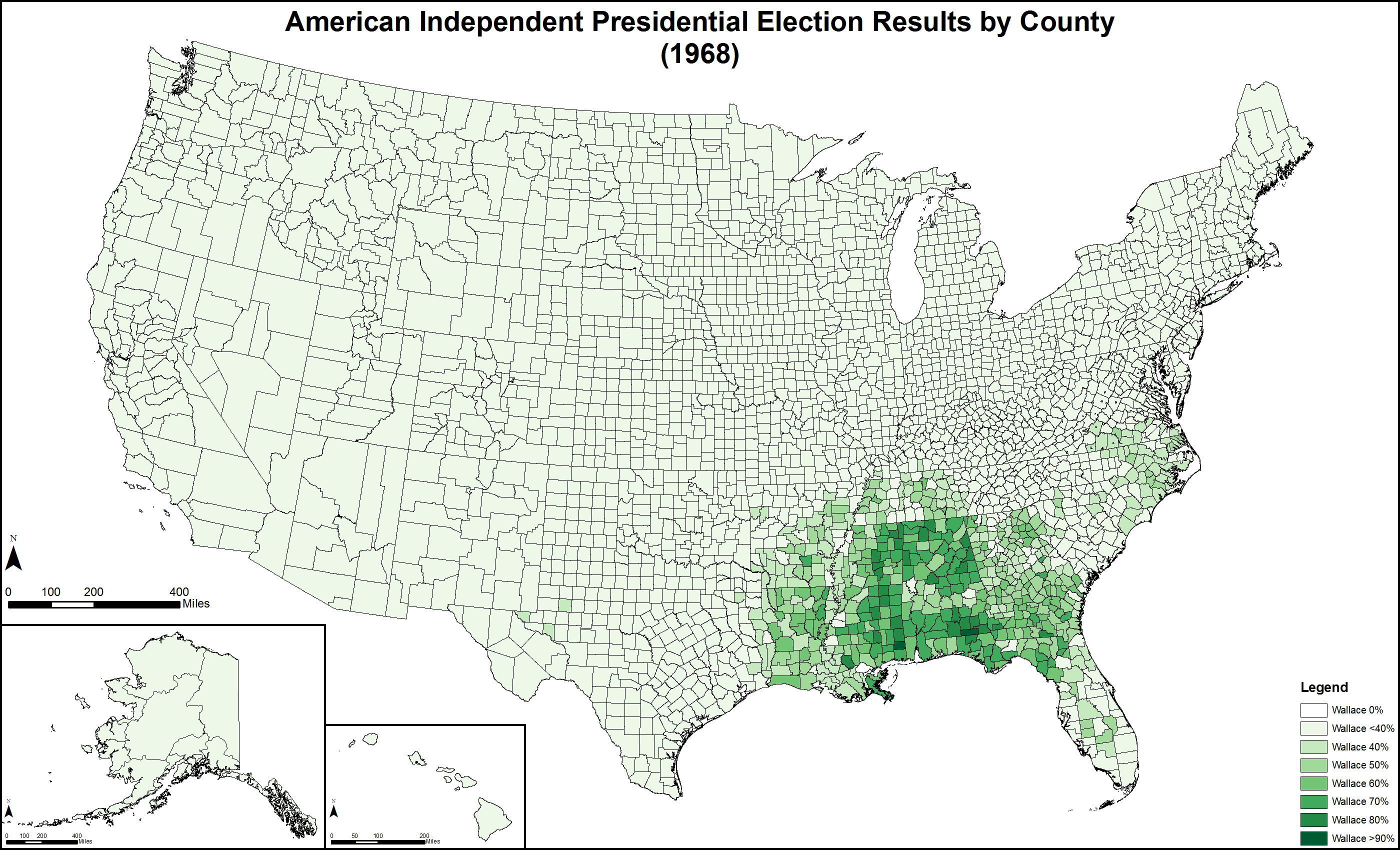
American Independent presidential election results by county

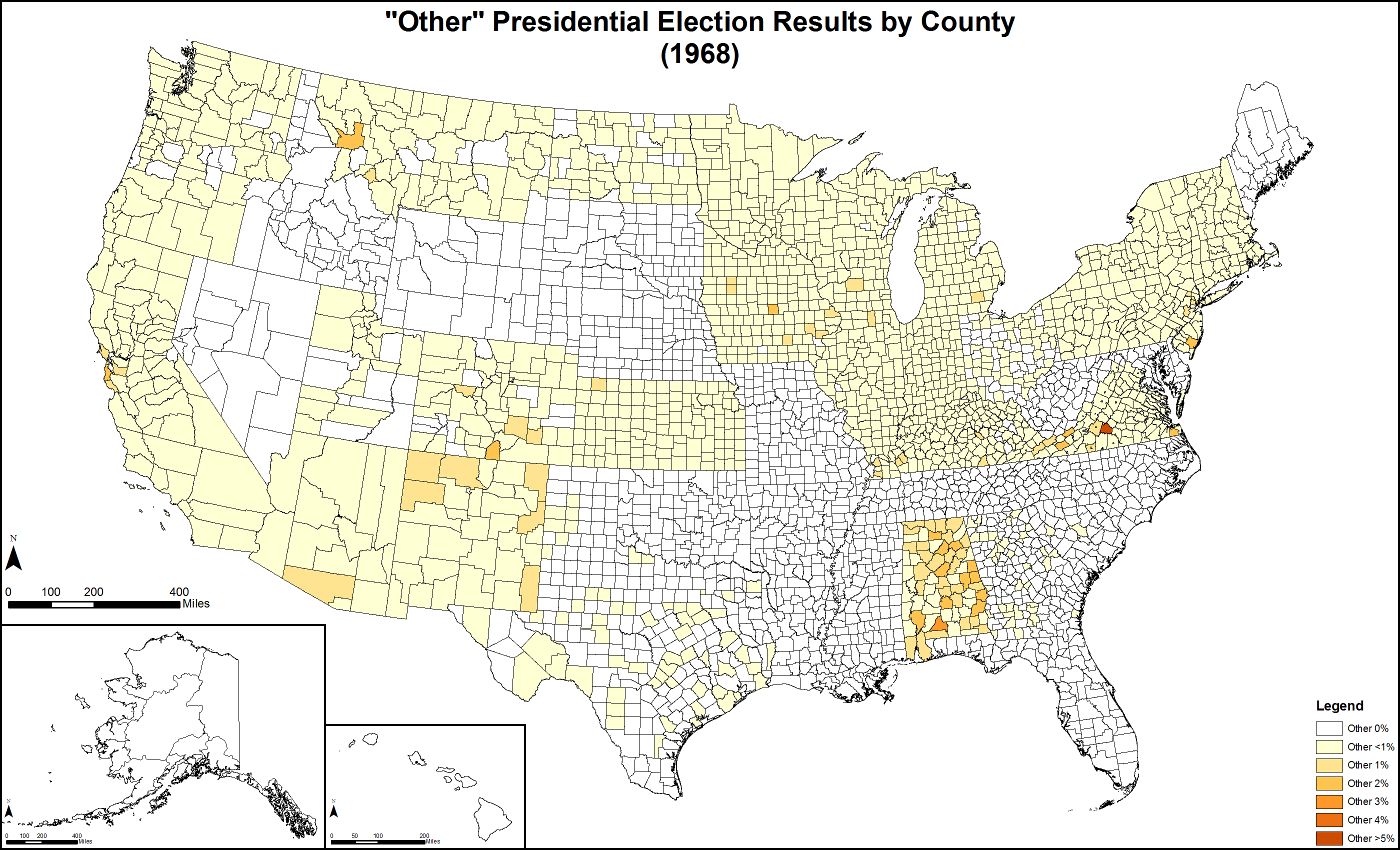
"Other" presidential election results by county

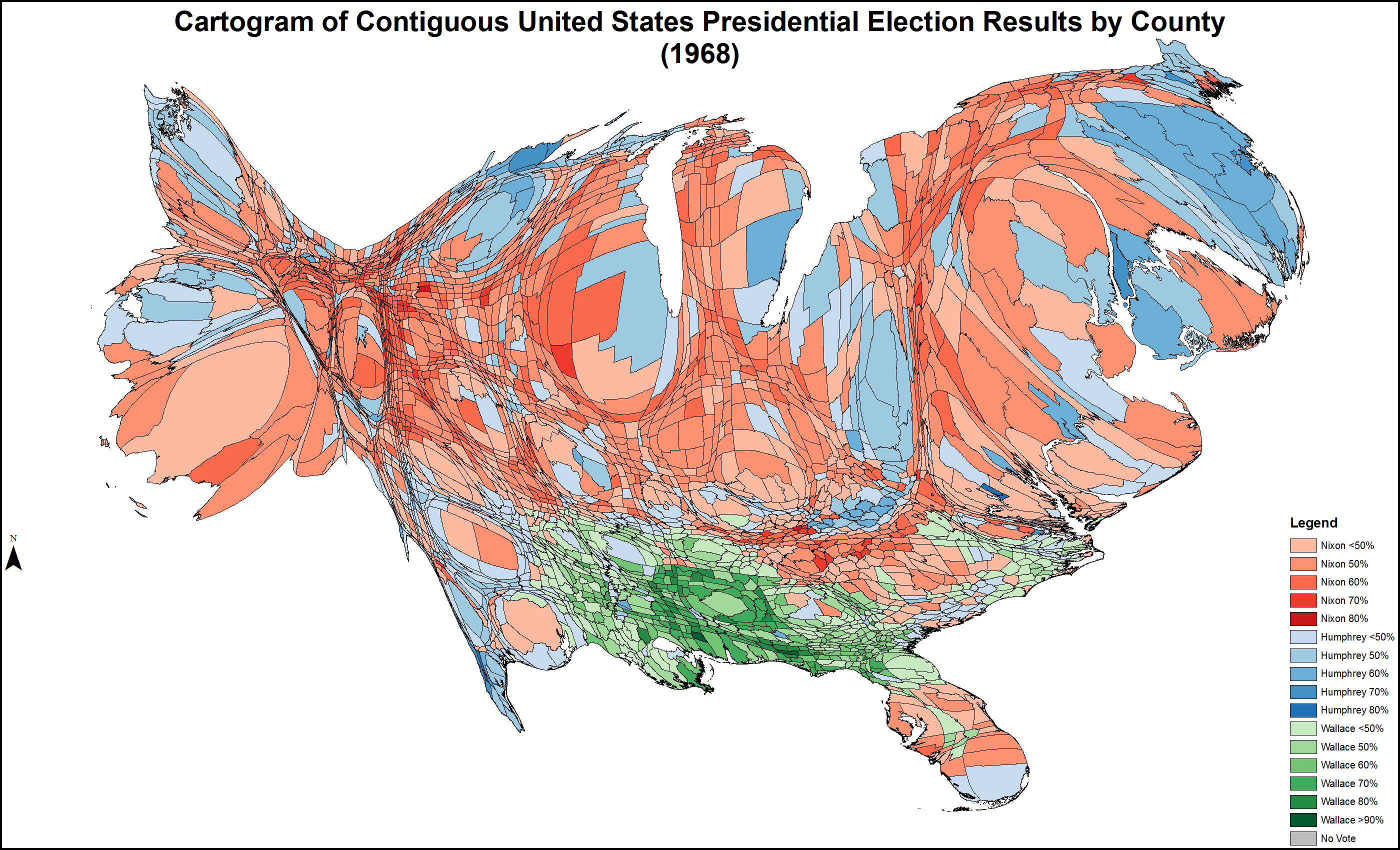
Cartogram of presidential election results by county

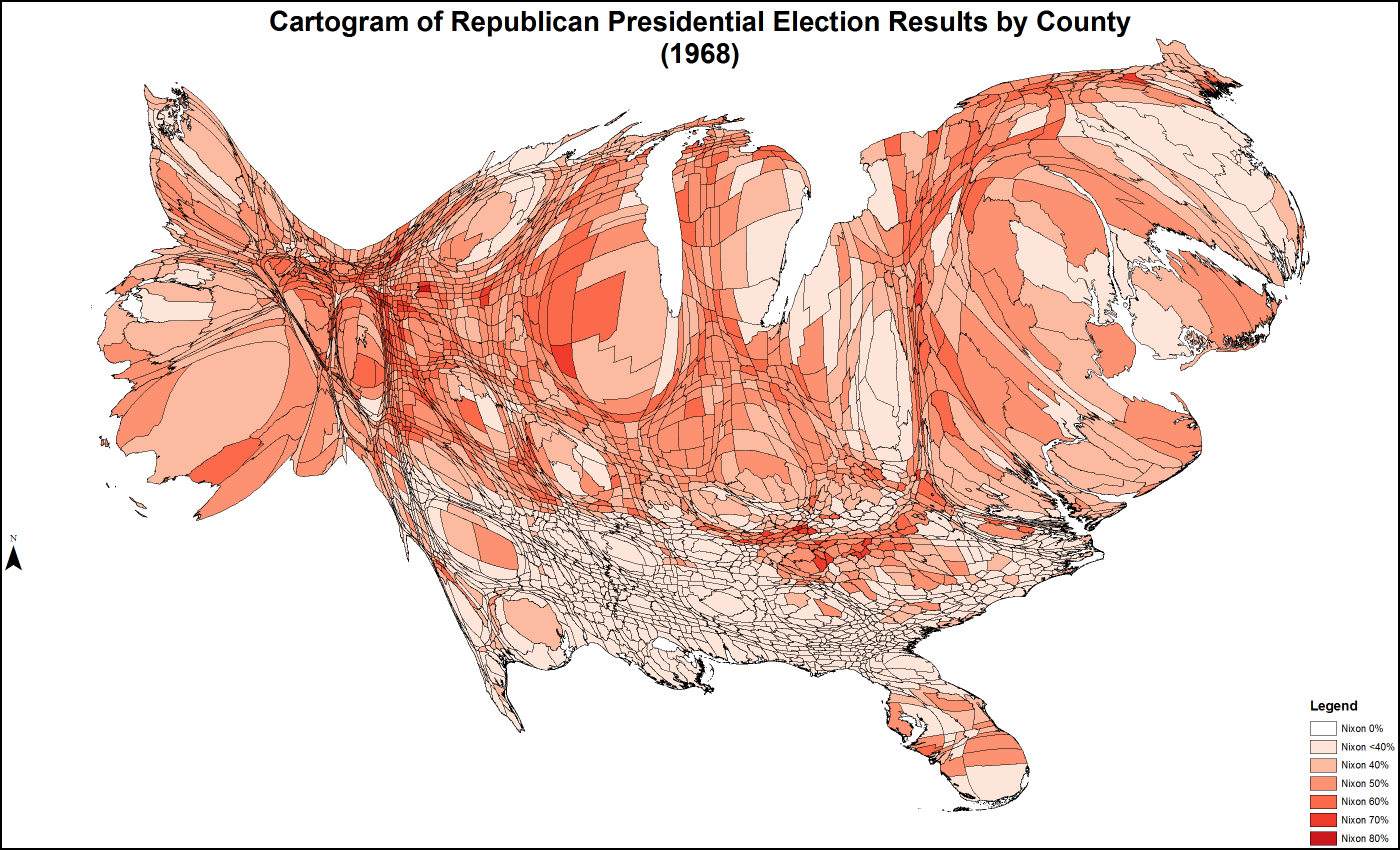
Cartogram of Republican presidential election results by county

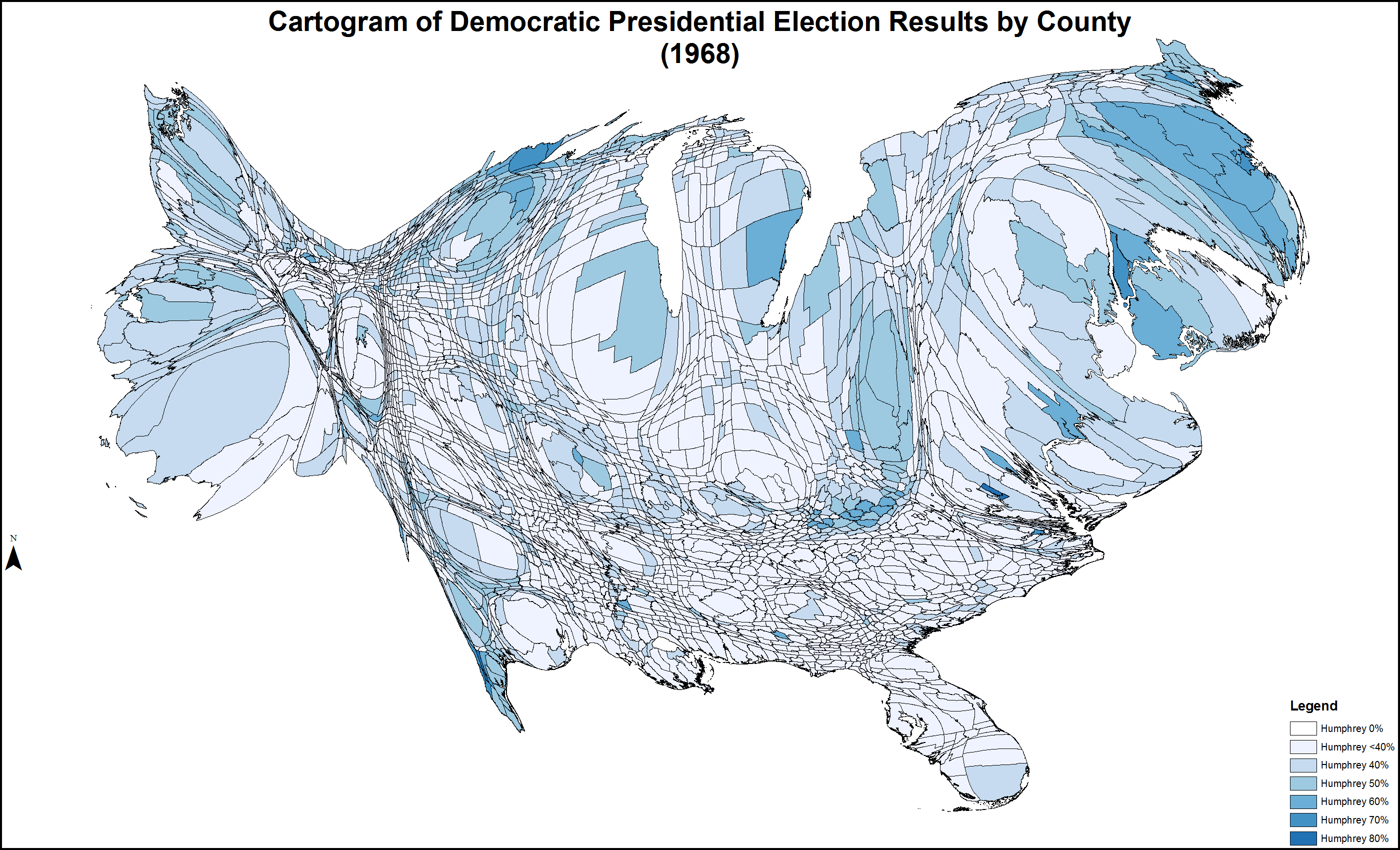
Cartogram of Democratic presidential election results by county

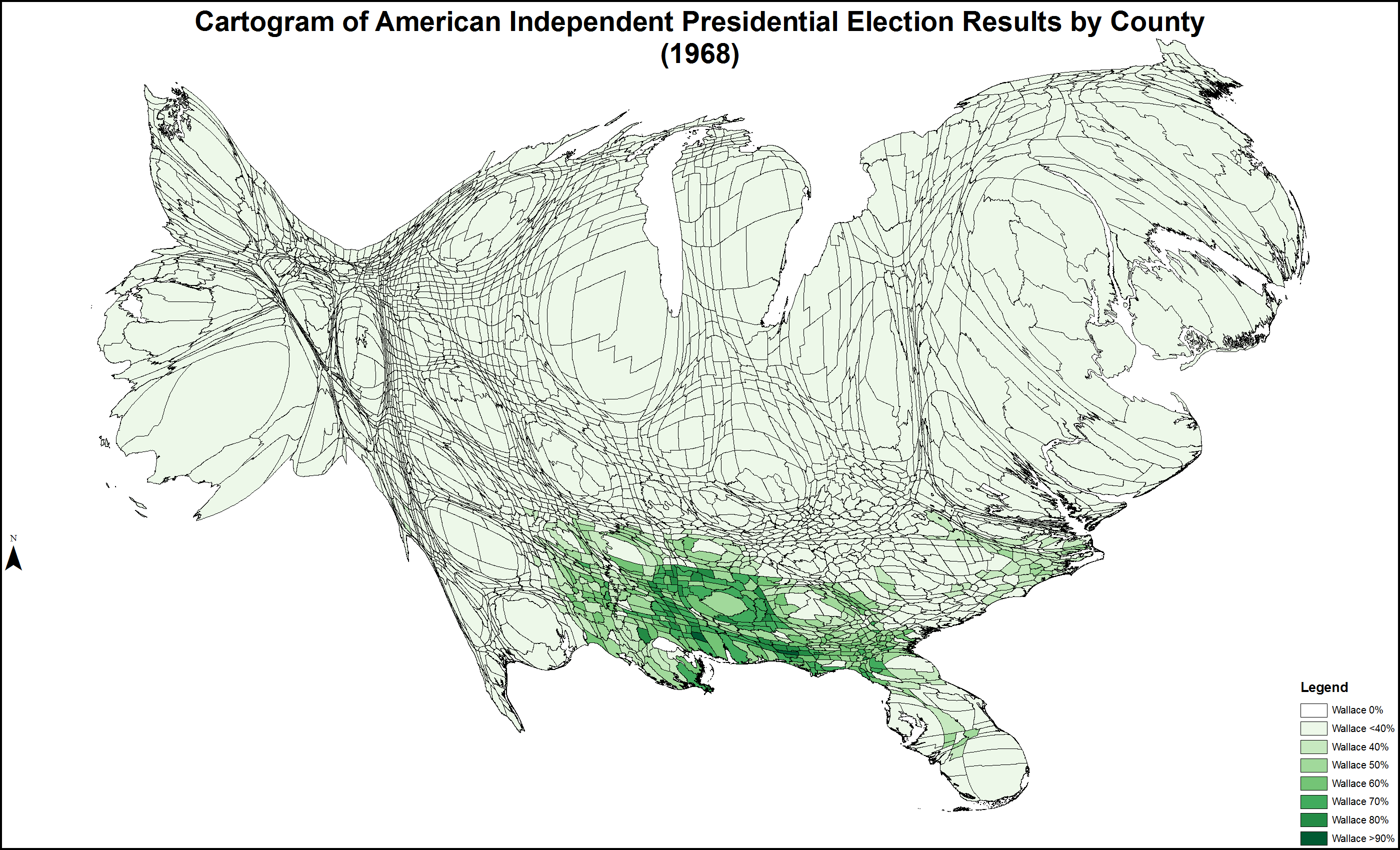
Cartogram of American Independent presidential election results by county

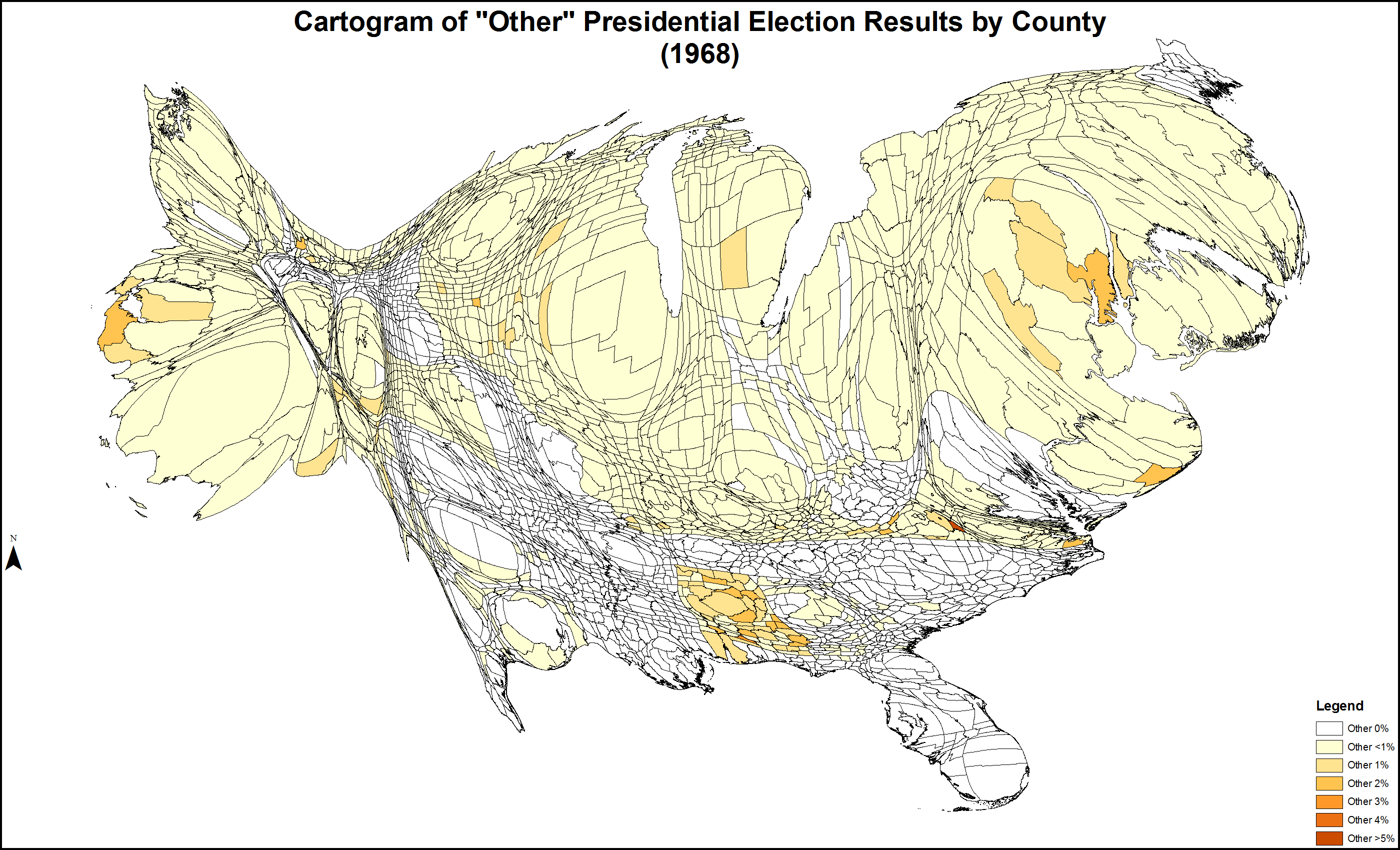
Cartogram of "Other" presidential election results by county

=== Results by state ===
States/districts won by Nixon/Agnew
States/districts won by Humphrey/Muskie
States/districts won by Wallace/LeMay

		Richard Nixon Republican			Hubert H. Humphrey Democratic			George Wallace American Independent			Margin		Margin swing (Note: Percentage point difference in margin from the 1964 election, of Republican over Democrat margins)	State Total	
State	electoral votes	#	%	electoral votes	#	%	electoral votes	#	%	electoral votes	#	%	%	#	
Alabama	10	146,923	13.99	-	196,579	18.72	-	691,425	65.86	10	-494,846	-47.13	-83.8%	1,049,917	AL
Alaska	3	37,600	45.28	3	35,411	42.65	-	10,024	12.07	-	2,189	2.64	34.5%	83,035	AK
Arizona	5	266,721	54.78	5	170,514	35.02	-	46,573	9.56	-	96,207	19.76	18.8%	486,936	AZ
Arkansas	6	189,062	31.01	-	184,901	30.33	-	235,627	38.65	6	-46,565	-7.64	13.1%	609,590	AR
California	40	3,467,664	47.82	40	3,244,318	44.74	-	487,270	6.72	-	223,346	3.08	21.4%	7,251,587	CA
Colorado	6	409,345	50.46	6	335,174	41.32	-	60,813	7.50	-	74,171	9.14	32.2%	811,199	CO
Connecticut	8	556,721	44.32	-	621,561	49.48	8	76,650	6.10	-	-64,840	-5.16	29.5%	1,256,232	CT
Delaware	3	96,714	45.12	3	89,194	41.61	-	28,459	13.28	-	7,520	3.51	25.7%	214,367	DE
D.C.	3	31,012	18.18	-	139,566	81.82	3	-	-	-	-108,554	-63.64	7.4%	170,578	DC
Florida	14	886,804	40.53	14	676,794	30.93	-	624,207	28.53	-	210,010	9.60	11.9%	2,187,805	FL
Georgia	12	380,111	30.40	-	334,440	26.75	-	535,550	42.83	12	-155,439	-12.43	-11.9%	1,250,266	GA
Hawaii	4	91,425	38.70	-	141,324	59.83	4	3,469	1.47	-	-49,899	-21.12	36.4%	236,218	HI
Idaho	4	165,369	56.79	4	89,273	30.66	-	36,541	12.55	-	76,096	26.13	28.0%	291,183	ID
Illinois	26	2,174,774	47.08	26	2,039,814	44.15	-	390,958	8.46	-	134,960	2.92	21.9%	4,619,749	IL
Indiana	13	1,067,885	50.29	13	806,659	37.99	-	243,108	11.45	-	261,226	12.30	24.7%	2,123,597	IN
Iowa	9	619,106	53.01	9	476,699	40.82	-	66,422	5.69	-	142,407	12.19	36.2%	1,167,931	IA
Kansas	7	478,674	54.84	7	302,996	34.72	-	88,921	10.19	-	175,678	20.13	29.2%	872,783	KS
Kentucky	9	462,411	43.79	9	397,541	37.65	-	193,098	18.29	-	64,870	6.14	34.5%	1,055,893	KY
Louisiana	10	257,535	23.47	-	309,615	28.21	-	530,300	48.32	10	-220,685	-20.11	-18.4%	1,097,450	LA
Maine	4	169,254	43.07	-	217,312	55.30	4	6,370	1.62	-	-48,058	-12.23	25.4%	392,936	ME
Maryland	10	517,995	41.94	-	538,310	43.59	10	178,734	14.47	-	-20,315	-1.64	29.3%	1,235,039	MD
Massachusetts	14	766,844	32.89	-	1,469,218	63.01	14	87,088	3.73	-	-702,374	-30.12	22.6%	2,331,752	MA
Michigan	21	1,370,665	41.46	-	1,593,082	48.18	21	331,968	10.04	-	-222,417	-6.73	26.9%	3,306,250	MI
Minnesota	10	658,643	41.46	-	857,738	54.00	10	68,931	4.34	-	-199,095	-12.53	15.2%	1,588,510	MN
Mississippi	7	88,516	13.52	-	150,644	23.02	-	415,349	63.46	7	-264,705	-40.44	-4.7%	654,509	MS
Missouri	12	811,932	44.87	12	791,444	43.74	-	206,126	11.39	-	20,488	1.13	29.2%	1,809,502	MO
Montana	4	138,835	50.60	4	114,117	41.59	-	20,015	7.29	-	24,718	9.01	27.4%	274,404	MT
Nebraska	5	321,163	59.82	5	170,784	31.81	-	44,904	8.36	-	150,379	28.01	33.2%	536,851	NE
Nevada	3	73,188	47.46	3	60,598	39.29	-	20,432	13.25	-	12,590	8.16	25.3%	154,218	NV
New Hampshire	4	154,903	52.10	4	130,589	43.93	-	11,173	3.76	-	24,314	8.18	36.0%	297,298	NH
New Jersey	17	1,325,467	46.10	17	1,264,206	43.97	-	262,187	9.12	-	61,261	2.13	33.9%	2,875,395	NJ
New Mexico	4	169,692	51.85	4	130,081	39.75	-	25,737	7.86	-	39,611	12.10	31.1%	327,281	NM
New York	43	3,007,932	44.30	-	3,378,470	49.76	43	358,864	5.29	-	-370,538	-5.46	31.8%	6,790,066	NY
North Carolina	13	627,192	39.51	12	464,113	29.24	-	496,188	31.26	1	131,004	8.25	20.6%	1,587,493	NC
North Dakota	4	138,669	55.94	4	94,769	38.23	-	14,244	5.75	-	43,900	17.71	33.8%	247,882	ND
Ohio	26	1,791,014	45.23	26	1,700,586	42.95	-	467,495	11.81	-	90,428	2.28	28.2%	3,959,698	OH
Oklahoma	8	449,697	47.68	8	301,658	31.99	-	191,731	20.33	-	148,039	15.70	27.2%	943,086	OK
Oregon	6	408,433	49.83	6	358,866	43.78	-	49,683	6.06	-	49,567	6.05	33.8%	819,622	OR
Pennsylvania	29	2,090,017	44.02	-	2,259,405	47.59	29	378,582	7.97	-	-169,388	-3.57	26.6%	4,747,928	PA
Rhode Island	4	122,359	31.78	-	246,518	64.03	4	15,678	4.07	-	-124,159	-32.25	29.5%	385,000	RI
South Carolina	8	254,062	38.09	8	197,486	29.61	-	215,430	32.30	-	38,632	5.79	-12.0%	666,982	SC
South Dakota	4	149,841	53.27	4	118,023	41.96	-	13,400	4.76	-	31,818	11.31	22.5%	281,264	SD
Tennessee	11	472,592	37.85	11	351,233	28.13	-	424,792	34.02	-	47,800	3.83	14.8%	1,248,617	TN
Texas	25	1,227,844	39.87	-	1,266,804	41.14	25	584,269	18.97	-	-38,960	-1.27	25.6%	3,079,406	TX
Utah	4	238,728	56.49	4	156,665	37.07	-	26,906	6.37	-	82,063	19.42	29.1%	422,568	UT
Vermont	3	85,142	52.75	3	70,255	43.53	-	5,104	3.16	-	14,887	9.22	41.8%	161,404	VT
Virginia	12	590,319	43.36	12	442,387	32.49	-	321,833	23.64	-	147,932	10.87	18.2%	1,361,491	VA
Washington	9	588,510	45.12	-	616,037	47.23	9	96,990	7.44	-	-27,527	-2.11	22.5%	1,304,281	WA
West Virginia	7	307,555	40.78	-	374,091	49.60	7	72,560	9.62	-	-66,536	-8.82	27.1%	754,206	WV
Wisconsin	12	809,997	47.89	12	748,804	44.27	-	127,835	7.56	-	61,193	3.62	28.0%	1,691,538	WI
Wyoming	3	70,927	55.76	3	45,173	35.51	-	11,105	8.73	-	25,754	20.25	33.4%	127,205	WY
TOTALS:	538	31,783,783	43.42	301	31,271,839	42.72	191	9,901,118	13.53	46	511,944	0.70	23.3%	73,199,998	US

==== States that flipped from Democratic to Republican ====
- Alaska
- California
- Colorado
- Delaware
- Florida
- Idaho
- Illinois
- Indiana
- Iowa
- Kansas
- Kentucky
- Missouri
- Montana
- Nebraska
- Nevada
- New Mexico
- New Hampshire
- New Jersey
- North Carolina
- North Dakota
- Ohio
- Oklahoma
- Oregon
- South Dakota
- Tennessee
- Utah
- Virginia
- Vermont
- Wisconsin
- Wyoming

==== States that flipped from Republican to American Independent ====
- Georgia
- Louisiana
- Alabama
- Mississippi

==== States that flipped from Democratic to American Independent ====
- Arkansas

=== Close states ===
States where margin of victory was less than 5 percentage points (223 electoral votes):

1. Missouri, 1.13% (20,488 votes)
2. Texas, 1.27% (38,960 votes)
3. Maryland, 1.64% (20,315 votes)
4. Washington, 2.11% (27,527 votes)
5. New Jersey, 2.13% (61,261 votes)
6. Ohio, 2.28% (90,428 votes) (tipping point state for Nixon win)
7. Alaska, 2.64% (2,189 votes)
8. Illinois, 2.92% (134,960 votes) (tipping point state for Humphrey win)
9. California, 3.08% (223,346 votes)
10. Delaware, 3.51% (7,520 votes)
11. Pennsylvania, 3.57% (169,388 votes)
12. Wisconsin, 3.62% (61,193 votes)
13. Tennessee, 3.83% (47,800 votes)

States where margin of victory was more than 5 percentage points, but less than 10 percentage points (155 electoral votes):

1. Kentucky, 5.14% (64,870 votes)
2. Connecticut, 5.16% (64,840 votes)
3. New York, 5.46% (370,538 votes)
4. South Carolina, 5.79% (38,632 votes)
5. Oregon, 6.05% (49,567 votes)
6. Michigan, 6.73% (222,417 votes)
7. Arkansas, 7.64% (46,565 votes)
8. Nevada, 8.17% (12,590 votes)
9. New Hampshire, 8.17% (24,314 votes)
10. North Carolina, 8.25% (131,004 votes)
11. West Virginia, 8.82% (66,536 votes)
12. Montana, 9.01% (24,718 votes)
13. Colorado, 9.14% (74,171 votes)
14. Vermont, 9.22% (14,887 votes)
15. Florida, 9.60% (210,010 votes)

Notes: In Alabama, Wallace was the official Democratic Party nominee, while Humphrey ran on the ticket of short-lived National Democratic Party of Alabama, loyal to him as an official Democratic Party nominee.

In North Carolina one Nixon Elector cast his ballot for George Wallace (President) and Curtis LeMay (Vice President).

==== Statistics ====
Counties with Highest Percent of Vote (Republican)

1. Hooker County, Nebraska 87.94%
2. Jackson County, Kentucky 84.09%
3. McIntosh County, North Dakota 82.65%
4. McPherson County, South Dakota 80.34%
5. Sioux County, Iowa 80.04%

Counties with Highest Percent of Vote (Democratic)

1. Duval County, Texas 88.74%
2. Jim Hogg County, Texas 82.06%
3. Washington, D.C. 81.82%
4. Webb County, Texas 79.65%
5. Suffolk County, Massachusetts 75.62%

Counties with Highest Percent of Vote (American Independent)

1. Geneva County, Alabama 91.73%
2. George County, Mississippi 91.20%
3. Lamar County, Alabama 88.25%
4. Calhoun County, Mississippi 87.80%
5. Holmes County, Florida 87.21%

== National voter demographics ==
The 1968 presidential vote by demographic subgroup
	Humphrey	Nixon	Wallace
Gender
Men	41	43	16
Women	45	43	12
Age
Under 30	47	38	15
30-49	44	41	15
50 or Older	41	47	12
Race
White	38	47	15
Non-White	85	12	3
Religion
Protestant	35	49	16
Catholic	59	33	8
Education
College	37	54	9
High School	42	43	15
Grade School	52	33	15
Occupation
Business	34	56	10
White Collar	41	47	12
Manual	50	35	15
Farmer	29	51	20
Party ID
Republican	9	85	5
Democrat	74	12	14
Independent	31	44	25
Region
East	50	43	7
Midwest	44	47	9
South	31	36	33
West	44	49	7
Union Status
Union Family	56	29	15

NBC sample precincts 1968 election
	% Humphrey	% Nixon	% Wallace
High income urban	32	63	5
Middle income urban	43	44	13
Low income urban	69	19	12
Rural (all income)	33	46	21
African-American neighborhoods	94	5	1
Italian neighborhoods	51	39	10
Slavic neighborhoods	65	24	11
Jewish neighborhoods	81	17	2
Unionized neighborhoods	61	29	10

Source: Congressional Quarterly Weekly Report. "Group Analysis of the 1968 Presidential Vote" XXVI, No. 48 (November 1968), p. 3218.

=== Voter demographics in the South ===
NBC sample precincts 1968 election: South only
	% Humphrey	% Nixon	% Wallace
Middle income urban neighborhoods	28	40	32
Low income urban neighborhoods	57	18	25
Rural (all income)	29	30	41
African-American neighborhoods	95	3	2
Hispanic neighborhoods	92	7	1

Source: Congressional Quarterly Weekly Report. "Group Analysis of the 1968 Presidential Vote", XXVI, No. 48 (November 1968), p. 3218.

=== Estimated voting age population ===
Out of the entire population, the Census Bureau in October 1968 estimated that 121.5 million people would be eligible to vote, including those in the military regardless of whether they were serving domestically or abroad. When including the civilian and military population, which were residing in the United States, it was estimated to be 120 million people. With the civilian population, it was estimated to be 118.5 million people would be eligible to vote.

== See also ==
- 1968 United States House of Representatives elections
- 1968 United States Senate elections
- 1968 United States gubernatorial elections
- History of the United States (1964–1980)
- History of the United States Democratic Party
- History of the United States Republican Party
- List of presidents of the United States
- First inauguration of Richard Nixon

== Sources ==
- White, Theodore H. (1970). The Making of the President 1968. Pocket Books.
