= Daniel Berrigan bibliography =

This is a bibliography of works by and about Daniel Joseph Berrigan, S.J. (May 9, 1921 – April 30, 2016), who was an American Jesuit priest, anti-war activist, poet, essayist, and university instructor. Berrigan was an award-winning and prolific author, who published more than 50 books during his life in 1957, he was awarded the Lamont Prize for his book of poems, Time Without Number.

== Chronological listing ==
Note: Daniel Berrigan was the author, or co-author, of more than fifty books.

=== Author or coauthor ===
- Berrigan, Daniel (1957). Time Without Number. New York: Macmillan. ASIN B0000CJVM4. OCLC 781490. – winner of the Lamont Poetry Prize
- — (1960). Encounters. Cleveland, OH: The World Publishing Company. OCLC 6175730.
- — (1968). Love, Love at the End: Parables, Prayers, and Meditations (1st ed.). New York: Macmillan. ISBN 978-0-02-083750-3. OCLC 5692967.
- — (1968). Night Flight to Hanoi: War Diary with 11 Poems. New York: The Macmillan Company. LCCN 68-56045.
- —; Lewis, Tom (1969). Trial Poems, Oct. 7, 1968. Chicago: Thomas More Association. OCLC 921848244.
- — (1970). No Bars to Manhood. New York: Doubleday. ASIN B0006CUA3E.
- —; Coles, Robert (1971). The Geography of Faith; Conversations between Daniel Berrigan, When Underground, and Robert Coles (2nd ed.). Boston: Beacon Press. ISBN 978-0-8070-0538-5. OCLC 239919.
- — (1971). The Dark Night of Resistance. Garden City, NY: Doubleday. ASIN B0006CFFDO. OCLC 8645060.
- — (1972). America Is Hard to Find (1st ed.). Garden City, NY: Doubleday. ISBN 978-0-385-00327-8. OCLC 427586.
- —; Berrigan, Philip (1973). Prison Poems (2nd ed.). Greensboro, NC: Unicorn Press. ISBN 978-0-87775-049-9. OCLC 726986.
- —; Lockwood, Lee (1973). Daniel Berrigan: Absurd Convictions, Modest Hopes; Conversations after prison with Lee Lockwood (1st ed.). New York: Vintage Books. ISBN 978-0-394-71912-2. OCLC 851142578.
- —; Nhất Hạnh, Thich (1975). The Raft Is Not the Shore: Conversations Toward a Buddhist-Christian Awareness (New York: Orbis Books, 2001 ed.). Boston: Beacon Press. ISBN 978-1-57075-344-2. OCLC 923481583.
- — (1976). "Statement on Poetry". The Worcester Review. IV.
- — (1978). The Words Our Savior Gave Us. Springfield, IL: Templegate. ISBN 978-0-87243-081-5. OCLC 4741540.
- — (1978). Uncommon Prayer: A Book of Psalms. New York: Seabury Press. ISBN 978-0-8164-0382-0. OCLC 730292696.
- — (1987). The Hole in the Ground: A Parable for Peacemakers. Minneapolis: Honeywell Project. ISBN 978-0-9619003-1-1. OCLC 19908429.
- — (1987). To Dwell in Peace: An Autobiography. Eugene, OR: Wipf & Stock. ISBN 978-1-55635-473-1. OCLC 307596569.
- — (1989). Stations: The Way of the Cross (1st ed.). San Francisco: Harper & Row. ISBN 978-0-06-060766-1. OCLC 18463446.
- — (1997). Ezekiel: Vision in the Dust. Maryknoll, NY: Orbis Books. ISBN 978-1570751356.
- — (1998). Dear, John (ed.). And the Risen Bread: Selected Poems, 1957–1997. New York: Fordham University Press. ISBN 978-0-8232-1821-9. OCLC 38519749.
- — (1998). Daniel, Under the Siege of the Divine (Eugene, OR: Wipf & Stock, 2009 ed.). Farmington, PA: The Plough Publishing House. ISBN 978-1-60608-467-0. OCLC 742612773.
- — (1999). Jeremiah: The World, the Wound of God. Minneapolis: Fortress Press. ISBN 978-0-8006-3138-3. OCLC 237341405.
- — (2000). The Bride: Images of the Church. Maryknoll, NY: Orbis Books. ISBN 978-1-57075-305-3. OCLC 43580565.
- — (2007). Prayer for the Morning Headlines: On the Sancity of Life and Death (1st ed.). Baltimore: Apprentice House. ISBN 978-1-934074-16-9. OCLC 123350245.
- — (2007). The Trouble with Our State (Audio book). New York: Yellow Bike Press. OCLC 275175135.

=== As a contributor ===
- — (2003). "Foreword". In Laffin, Arthur J. (ed.). Swords into plowshares: A chronology of Plowshares disarmament actions, 1980–2003. Marion, SD: Rose Hill Books. ISBN 978-0-9636224-8-8. OCLC 57026242., reprinted as Laffin, Arthur, ed. (2010). Swords into plowshares: A chronology of Plowshares disarmament actions, 1980–2003. Catholic Worker reprint series. Eugene, OR: Wipf & Stock. ISBN 978-1-60899-051-1. OCLC 883666494.
- — (2004). "Letter to The Weathermen". In James, Joy (ed.). Imprisoned intellectuals: America's political prisoners write on life, liberation, and rebellion. Transformative Politics Series. Rowman & Littlefield Publishers. p. 239-247. ISBN 978-0-585-45508-2.

=== Miscellaneous ===
- Bread and Puppet Theater; McKendree Spring (Spring 1970). America Is Hard to Find Berrigan Weekend (video). OCLC 3705054.

== Works about Berrigan ==
- Francine du Plessix Gray, Divine Disobedience: Profiles in Catholic Radicalism (Knopf, 1970)
- Murray Polner and Jim O'Grady, Disarmed and Dangerous: The Radical Lives and Times of Daniel and Philip Berrigan, Brothers in Religious Faith & Civil Disobedience (Basic Books, 1997 and Westview Press, 1998)
- Daniel Cosacchi and Eric Martin, eds., The Berrigan Letters: Personal Correspondence between Daniel and Philip Berrigan (Orbis Books, 2016)
- Joseph Palermo, "Father Daniel Berrigan: The FBI's Most Wanted Peace Activist", in The Human Tradition in America Since 1945, edited by David L. Anderson, (Scholarly Resources, 2003)
