= Electoral history of Eugene McCarthy =

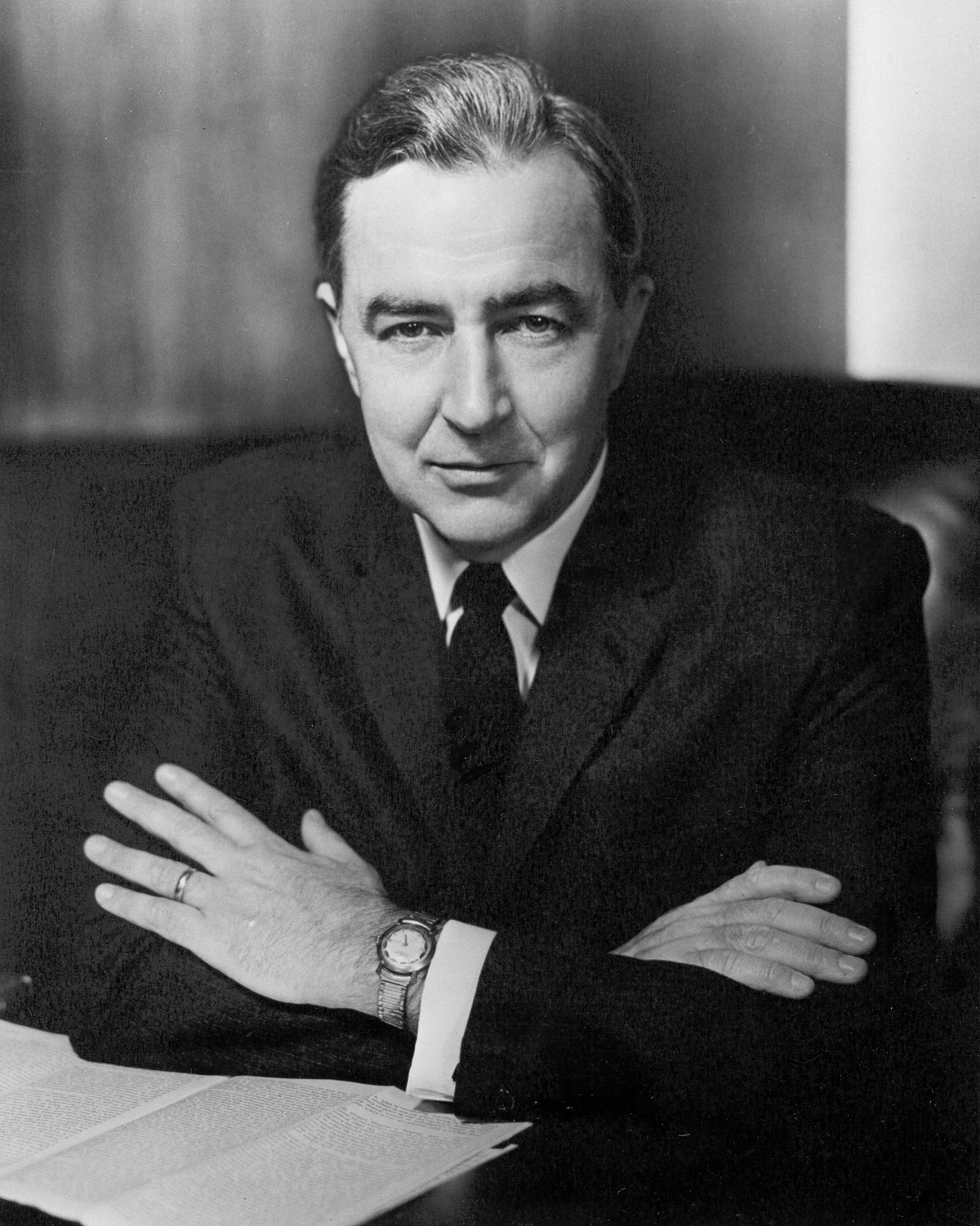
Senator Eugene McCarthy (D-MN)

Electoral history of Eugene McCarthy, United States Senator (1959–1971) and Representative (1949–1959) from Minnesota. He was a member of the Minnesota Democratic-Farmer-Labor Party (Democratic Party on the national level).

McCarthy was also a candidate for the 1968 Democratic presidential nomination, coming first in the primaries. He later ran for President four times.

== House and Senate races (1948-1964) ==
Minnesota's 4th congressional district, 1948:

- Eugene McCarthy (DFL) - 78,476 (59.43%)
- Edward Devitt (R) (inc.) - 53,574 (40.57%)

Minnesota's 4th congressional district, 1950:

- Eugene McCarthy (DFL) (inc.) - 59,930 (60.39%)
- Ward Fleming (R) - 39,307 (39.61%)

Minnesota's 4th congressional district, 1952:

- Eugene McCarthy (DFL) (inc.) - 98,015 (61.71%)
- Roger G. Kennedy (R) - 60,827 (38.29%)

Minnesota's 4th congressional district, 1954:

- Eugene McCarthy (DFL) (inc.) - 81,651 (63.01%)
- Dick Hansen (R) - 47,933 (36.99%)

Minnesota's 4th congressional district, 1956:

- Eugene McCarthy (DFL) (inc.) - 103,320 (64.07%)
- Edward C. Slettedahl (R) - 57,947 (35.93%)

United States Senate election in Minnesota, 1958:

- Eugene McCarthy (DFL) - 608,847 (52.95%)
- Edward John Thye (R) (inc.) - 535,629 (46.58%)
- William M. Curran (Socialist Workers) - 5,407 (0.47%)

United States Senate election in Minnesota, 1964:

- Eugene McCarthy (DFL) (inc.) - 931,363 (60.34%)
- Wheelock Whitney, Jr. (R) - 605,933 (39.26%)
- William Braatz (Industrial Government) - 3,947 (0.26%)
- Everett E. Luoma (Socialist Workers) - 2,357 (0.15%)

== 1968 presidential election ==
New Hampshire Democratic presidential primary, 1968:

- Lyndon B. Johnson (inc.) - 27,520 (49.62%)
- Eugene McCarthy - 23,263 (41.94%)
- Richard Nixon - 2,532 (4.57%)
- Robert F. Kennedy - 606 (1.09%)
- Paul C. Fisher - 506 (0.91%)
- Nelson Rockefeller - 249 (0.45%)
- George Wallace - 201 (0.36%)

New Hampshire Democratic vice presidential primary, 1968:

- Hubert Humphrey (inc.) - 7,622 (56.25%)
- Robert F. Kennedy - 2,833 (20.91%)
- Eugene McCarthy - 1,105 (8.16%)
- Paul C. Fisher - 858 (6.33%)
- Lyndon B. Johnson - 385 (2.84%)
- Claude R. Kirk Jr. - 339 (2.50%)
- John A. Volpe - 205 (1.51%)
- Richard Nixon - 159 (1.17%)
- George Wallace - 44 (0.33%)

Wisconsin Democratic presidential primary, 1968:

- Eugene McCarthy - 412,160 (56.23%)
- Lyndon B. Johnson (inc.) - 253,696 (34.61%)
- Robert F. Kennedy - 46,507 (6.35%)
- None of These Candidates - 11,861 (1.62%)
- George Wallace - 4,031 (0.55%)
- Hubert Humphrey - 3,605 (0.49%)
- Scattering - 1,142 (0.16%)

Pennsylvania Democratic presidential primary, 1968:

- Eugene McCarthy - 428,891 (71.49%)
- Robert F. Kennedy - 65,430 (10.91%)
- Hubert Humphrey - 51,998 (8.67%)
- George Wallace - 24,147 (4.03%)
- Lyndon B. Johnson (inc.) - 21,265 (3.54%)
- Richard Nixon - 3,434 (0.57%)
- Others - 2,556 (0.43%)

Massachusetts Democratic presidential primary, 1968:

- Eugene McCarthy - 122,697 (49.30%)
- Robert F. Kennedy - 68,604 (27.56%)
- Hubert Humphrey - 44,156 (17.74%)
- Lyndon B. Johnson (inc.) - 6,890 (2.77%)
- Nelson Rockefeller - 2,275 (0.91%)
- George Wallace - 1,688 (0.68%)
- Others - 2,593 (1.04%)

Indiana Democratic presidential primary, 1968:

- Robert F. Kennedy - 328,118 (42.26%)
- Roger D. Branigin - 238,700 (30.74%)
- Eugene McCarthy - 209,695 (27.01%)

Nebraska Democratic presidential primary, 1968:

- Robert F. Kennedy - 84,102 (51.72%)
- Eugene McCarthy - 50,655 (31.15%)
- Hubert Humphrey - 12,087 (7.43%)
- Lyndon B. Johnson (inc.) - 9,187 (5.65%)
- Richard Nixon - 2,731 (1.68%)
- Ronald Reagan - 1,905 (1.17%)
- George Wallace - 1,298 (0.80%)
- Others - 646 (0.40%)

Florida Democratic presidential primary, 1968:

- George Smathers - 236,242 (46.11%)
- Eugene McCarthy - 147,216 (28.73%)
- Scott Kelly - 128,899 (25.16%)

Oregon Democratic presidential primary, 1968:

- Eugene McCarthy - 163,990 (43.96%)
- Robert F. Kennedy - 141,631 (37.96%)
- Lyndon B. Johnson (inc.) - 45,174 (12.11%)
- Hubert Humphrey - 12,421 (3.33%)
- Ronald Reagan - 3,082 (0.83%)
- Richard Nixon - 2,974 (0.80%)
- Nelson Rockefeller - 2,841 (0.76%)
- George Wallace - 957 (0.26%)

South Dakota Democratic presidential primary, 1968:

- Robert F. Kennedy - 31,826 (49.51%)
- Lyndon B. Johnson - 19,316 (30.05%)
- Eugene McCarthy - 13,145 (20.45%)

New Jersey Democratic presidential primary, 1968:

- Eugene McCarthy - 9,906 (36.09%)
- Robert F. Kennedy - 8,603 (31.35%)
- Hubert Humphrey - 5,578 (20.32%)
- George Wallace - 1,399 (5.10%)
- Richard Nixon - 1,364 (4.97%)
- Others - 596 (2.17%)

California Democratic presidential primary, 1968:

- Robert F. Kennedy - 1,472,166 (46.27%)
- Eugene McCarthy - 1,329,301 (41.78%)
- Thomas C. Lynch - 380,286 (11.95%)

Illinois Democratic presidential primary, 1968:

- Eugene McCarthy - 4,646 (38.59%)
- Ted Kennedy - 4,052 (33.66%)
- Hubert Humphrey - 2,059 (17.10%)
- George Wallace - 768 (6.38%)
- Lyndon B. Johnson (inc.) - 162 (1.35%)
- Others - 351 (2.92%)

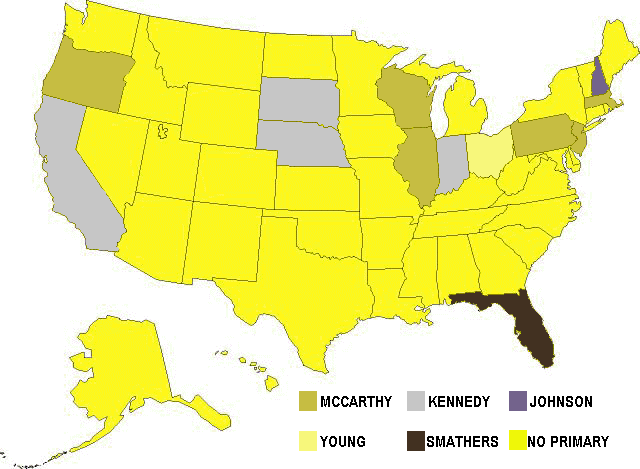
1968 Democratic primary results by state

1968 Democratic presidential primaries:

- Eugene McCarthy - 2,914,933 (38.73%)
- Robert F. Kennedy - 2,305,148 (30.63%)
- Stephen M. Young - 549,140 (7.30%)
- Lyndon B. Johnson (inc.) - 383,590 (5.10%)
- Thomas C. Lynch - 380,286 (5.05%)
- Roger D. Branigin - 238,700 (3.17%)
- George Smathers - 236,242 (3.14%)
- Hubert Humphrey - 166,463 (2.21%)
- Unpledged - 161,143 (2.14%)
- Scott Kelly - 128,899 (1.71%)
- George Wallace - 34,489 (0.46%)

1968 Democratic National Convention (presidential tally):

- Hubert Humphrey - 1,760 (67.43%)
- Eugene McCarthy - 601 (23.03%)
- George McGovern - 147 (5.63%)
- Channing E. Phillips - 68 (2.61%)
- Daniel K. Moore - 18 (0.69%)
- Ted Kennedy - 13 (0.50%)
- Paul Bryant - 1 (0.04%)
- James H. Gray - 1 (0.04%)
- George Wallace - 1 (0.04%)

1968 Democratic National Convention (vice presidential tally):

- Edmund Muskie - 1,945 (74.01%)
- Abstaining - 605 (23.02%)
- Julian Bond - 49 (1.87%)
- David C. Hoeh - 4 (0.15%)
- Ted Kennedy - 4 (0.15%)
- Eugene McCarthy - 3 (0.11%)
- Richard J. Daley - 2 (0.08%)
- Don Edwards - 2 (0.08%)
- George McGovern - 2 (0.08%)
- Robert McNair - 2 (0.08%)
- Abraham A. Ribicoff - 2 (0.08%)
- James Tate - 2 (0.08%)
- Allard Lowenstein - 1 (0.04%)
- Paul O'Dwyer - 1 (0.04%)
- Henry Reuss - 1 (0.04%)
- William F. Ryan - 1 (0.04%)
- Terry Sanford - 1 (0.04%)
- Sargent Shriver - 1 (0.04%)

1968 United States presidential election:

- Richard Nixon/Spiro Agnew (R) - 31,783,783 (43.4%) and 301 electoral votes (32 states carried)
- Hubert Humphrey/Edmund Muskie (D) - 31,271,839 (42.7%) and 191 electoral votes (13 states and D.C. carried)
- George Wallace/Curtis LeMay (AI) - 9,901,118 (13.5%) and 46 electoral votes (5 states carried)
- Eugene McCarthy (I) - 25,634
- Others - 243,258 (0.3%)

== Later presidential races ==
1972 Democratic presidential primaries:

- Hubert Humphrey - 4,121,372 (25.77%)
- George McGovern - 4,053,451 (25.34%)
- George Wallace - 3,755,424 (23.48%)
- Edmund Muskie - 1,840,217 (11.51%)
- Eugene McCarthy - 553,990 (3.46%)
- Henry M. Jackson - 505,198 (3.16%)
- Shirley Chisholm - 430,703 (2.69%)
- Terry Sanford - 331,415 (2.07%)
- John Lindsay - 196,406 (1.23%)
- Samuel Yorty - 79,446 (0.50%)
- Wilbur Mills - 37,401 (0.23%)
- Walter E. Fauntroy - 21,217 (0.13%)
- Unpledged - 19,533 (0.12%)
- Ted Kennedy - 16,693 (0.10%)
- Vance Hartke - 11,798 (0.07%)
- Patsy Mink - 8,286 (0.05%)
- None - 6,269 (0.04%)

1972 Democratic National Convention (presidential tally):

- George McGovern - 1,729 (57.37%)
- Henry M. Jackson - 525 (17.42%)
- George Wallace - 382 (12.67%)
- Shirley Chisholm - 152 (5.04%)
- Terry Sanford - 78 (2.59%)
- Hubert Humphrey - 67 (2.22%)
- Wilbur Mills - 34 (1.13%)
- Edmund Muskie - 25 (0.83%)
- Ted Kennedy - 13 (0.43%)
- Wayne L. Hays - 5 (0.17%)
- Eugene McCarthy - 2 (0.07%)
- Ramsey Clark - 1 (0.03%)
- Walter Mondale - 1 (0.03%)

1972 Democratic National Convention (vice presidential tally):

- Thomas Eagleton - 1,742 (59.07%)
- Frances Farenthold - 405 (13.73%)
- Mike Gravel - 226 (7.66%)
- Endicott Peabody - 108 (3.66%)
- Clay Smothers - 74 (2.51%)
- Birch Bayh - 62 (2.10%)
- Peter Rodino - 57 (1.93%)
- Jimmy Carter - 30 (1.02%)
- Shirley Chisholm - 20 (0.68%)
- Moon Landrieu - 19 (0.64%)
- Edward T. Breathitt - 18 (0.61%)
- Ted Kennedy - 15 (0.51%)
- Fred R. Harris - 14 (0.48%)
- Richard G. Hatcher - 11 (0.37%)
- Harold E. Hughes - 10 (0.34%)
- Joseph M. Montoya - 9 (0.31%)
- William L. Guy - 8 (0.27%)
- Adlai Stevenson III - 8 (0.27%)
- Robert Bergland - 5 (0.17%)
- Hodding Carter - 5 (0.17%)
- Cesar Chavez - 5 (0.17%)
- Wilbur Mills - 5 (0.17%)
- Wendell Anderson - 4 (0.14%)
- Stanley Arnold - 4 (0.14%)
- Ron Dellums - 4 (0.14%)
- John J. Houlihan - 4 (0.14%)
- Roberto A. Mondragon - 4 (0.14%)
- Reubin O'Donovan Askew - 3 (0.10%)
- Herman Badillo - 3 (0.10%)
- Eugene McCarthy - 3 (0.10%)
- Claiborne Pell - 3 (0.10%)
- Terry Sanford - 3 (0.10%)
- Ramsey Clark - 2 (0.07%)
- Richard J. Daley - 2 (0.07%)
- John DeCarlo - 2 (0.07%)
- Ernest Gruening - 2 (0.07%)
- Roger Mudd - 2 (0.07%)
- Edmund Muskie - 2 (0.07%)
- Claude Pepper - 2 (0.07%)
- Abraham Ribicoff - 2 (0.07%)
- Pat Taylor - 2 (0.07%)
- Leonard F. Woodcock - 2 (0.07%)
- Bruno Agnoli - 2 (0.07%)
- Ernest Albright - 1 (0.03%)
- William A. Barrett - 1 (0.03%)
- Daniel Berrigan - 1 (0.03%)
- Phillip Berrigan - 1 (0.03%)
- Julian Bond - 1 (0.03%)
- Hargrove Bowles - 1 (0.03%)
- Archibald Burton - 1 (0.03%)
- Phillip Burton - 1 (0.03%)
- William Chappell - 1 (0.03%)
- Lawton Chiles - 1 (0.03%)
- Frank Church - 1 (0.03%)
- Robert Drinan - 1 (0.03%)
- Nick Galifianakis - 1 (0.03%)
- John Goodrich - 1 (0.03%)
- Michael Griffin - 1 (0.03%)
- Martha Griffiths - 1 (0.03%)
- Charles Hamilton - 1 (0.03%)
- Patricia Harris - 1 (0.03%)
- Jim Hunt - 1 (0.03%)
- Daniel Inouye - 1 (0.03%)
- Henry M. Jackson - 1 (0.03%)
- Robery Kariss - 1 (0.03%)
- Allard K. Lowenstein - 1 (0.03%)
- Mao Zedong - 1 (0.03%)
- Eleanor McGovern - 1 (0.03%)
- Martha Mitchell - 1 (0.03%)
- Ralph Nader - 1 (0.03%)
- George Norcross - 1 (0.03%)
- Jerry Rubin - 1 (0.03%)
- Fred Seaman - 1 (0.03%)
- Joe Smith - 1 (0.03%)
- Benjamin Spock - 1 (0.03%)
- Patrick Tavolacci - 1 (0.03%)
- George Wallace - 1 (0.03%)

1976 United States presidential election:

- Jimmy Carter/Walter Mondale (D) - 40,831,881 (50.08%) and 297 electoral votes (23 states and D.C. carried)
- Gerald Ford (inc.)/Bob Dole (R) - 39,148,634 (48.02%) and 240 electoral votes (27 states carried)
- Ronald Reagan/Bob Dole (R) - 1 electoral vote (Washington faithless elector)
- Eugene McCarthy/Various (I) - 740,460 (0.91)
- Roger MacBride/David Bergland (LBT) - 172,553 (0.21%)
- Lester Maddox/William Dyke (AI) - 170,274 0.21%
- Thomas J. Anderson/Rufus Shackelford (American) - 158,271 (0.19%)
- Peter Camejo/Willie Mae Reid (Socialist Workers) - 90,986 (0.11%)
- Gus Hall/Jarvis Tyner (Communist) - 58,709 (0.07%)
- Margareth Wright/Benjamin Spock (People's) - 49,013 (0.06%)
- Lyndon LaRouche/R. Wayne Evans (U.S. Labor) - 40,043 (0.05%)
- Others - 70,785 (0.08%)

1988 United States presidential election:

- George H. W. Bush/Dan Quayle (R) - 48,886,597 (53.4%) and 426 electoral votes (40 states carried)
- Michael Dukakis/Lloyd Bentsen (D) - 41,809,476 (45.6%) and 111 electoral votes (10 states and D.C. carried)
- Lloyd Bentsen/Michael Dukakis (D) - 1 electoral vote (West Virginia faithless elector)
- Ron Paul/Andre Marrou (MBT) - 431,750 (0.5%)
- Lenora Fulani/Various (New Alliance) - 217,221 (0.2%)
- David Duke (Populist) - 47,043 (0.05%)
- Eugene McCarthy/Florence Rice (Consumer) - 30,905 (0.03%)

1992 Democratic presidential primaries:

- Bill Clinton - 10,482,411 (52.01%)
- Jerry Brown - 4,071,232 (20.20%)
- Paul Tsongas - 3,656,010 (18.14%)
- Unpledged - 750,873 (3.73%)
- Bob Kerrey - 318,457 (1.58%)
- Tom Harkin - 280,304 (1.39%)
- Lyndon LaRouche - 154,599 (0.77%)
- Eugene McCarthy - 108,678 (0.54%)
- Charles Woods - 88,948 (0.44%)
- Larry Agran - 58,611 (0.29%)
- Ross Perot - 54,755 (0.27%)
- Ralph Nader - 35,935 (0.18%)
- Louis Stokes - 29,983 (0.15%)
- Angus Wheeler McDonald - 9,900 (0.05%)
- J. Louis McAlpine - 7,911 (0.04%)
- George W. Benns - 7,887 (0.04%)
- Rufus T. Higginbotham - 7,705 (0.04%)
- Tom Howard Hawks - 7,434 (0.04%)
- Stephen Bruke - 5,261 (0.03%)
- Tom Laughlin - 5,202 (0.03%)
- Tom Shiekman - 4,965 (0.03%)
- Jeffrey F. Marsh - 2,445 (0.01%)
- George Ballard - 2,067 (0.01%)
- Ray Rollinson - 1,206 (0.01%)
- Leonora Fulani - 402 (0.00%)
- Douglas Wilder - 240 (0.00%)

== Other later races ==
Minnesota Democratic-Farmer-Labor Party primary for the United States Senate, 1982:

- Mark Dayton - 359,014 (69.06%)
- Eugene McCarthy - 125,229 (24.09%)
- Charles E. Pearson - 19,855 (3.82%)
- William A. Branstner - 15,754 (3.03%)
