= Black capitalism =

Political movement among African Americans

Black capitalism is a concept that emerged (Note: The term itself is attested much earlier. For example in Solomon Kuznets's 1937 review of Abram L. Harris's 1936 study, The Negro as Capitalist. A Study of Banking and Business Among American Negroes. (Kuznets 1937, pp. 191–193)) some decades after WW2 and took on popular traction sometime around the time Richard Nixon was elected president of the United States. Nixon had endorsed the idea that the human rights of black Americans was intimately bound up with their rights to own property and accrue the economic power that comes from proprietary wealth. (Note: "During his campaign, Nixon tried to get more black votes telling black Americans during a radio broadcast on April 25, 1968, that 'To have human rights people need property rights and has this been more true than in the case of the Negro today. He must have the economic power that comes from ownership, a share of the wealth and a piece of the action'." (Tolson 1975, p. 9)) Around this juncture (1969), some 163,000 black firms existed in the United States. The fact that black businessmen and economic thinkers flourished in the first half of the 20th century has been ignored or neglected in standard economic history books until relatively recently.

Since Afro-American entrepreneurial activities take place within the capitalist economic system of the United States, political and economic theories have lacked a concept that might recognize black capitalism as a distinctive practice. By 1975, the notion itself was often dismissed as meaningless, or an empty slogan, since capitalism is considered "colour-blind" or neutral with regard to the ethnicity of its exponents. In 1993, Earl Ofari Hutchinson dismissed it as a myth.

In 1975, Arthur J. Tolson recognized that the term was something of a misnomer. Adducing a remark by Theodore Cross, Tolson stated that White Americans would have defined black capitalism as any form of investment practice adopted by Afro-Americans to improve the economy of ghettos and transfer businesses from white to black control. The assumption in usage was that communities where black capitalists concentrated their investment strategies formed an autonomous block running alongside, or segregated from, the wider system of American capitalism.

== Historical roots ==
=== Beginnings to 1900 ===
Black entrepreneurship has been traced back to Africa itself. University of Texas economic historian Juliet E. K. Walker has argued that the African elites who collaborated in the supply side of slavery lived in kingdoms where agriculture, construction, fishing, craft and merchant guilds were well established, and that the marketability of kidnapped Africans was also linked to their background and competences in areas like mining, cattle-raising, and rice cultivation. Between 1837 and 1841, writing for the Coloured American newspaper under the pseudonym Augustine, Lewis Woodson had set forth an early comprehensive and systematic plan for achieving the economic uplift of his fellow African Americans. Woodson was an early teacher and mentor of Martin Delany, who became his protégé.

Historically even prior to the Civil War, a significant number of blacks in northern states engaged in all manner of skilled trades. On the eve of the war, free Afro-Americans numbered 88,070, with an estimated collective wealth of around $50 million, accumulated evenly between their respective populations in the northern and southern states. Even in the slave states of the South, wherever dense concentrations of Afro-Americans existed, such as in cities like Savannah, Charleston, New Orleans and Richmond, blacks keen to escape from selling their labour for wages, managed to run a number of profitable enterprises. Free blacks like Martin Delany openly stated that social elevation by blacks would be related to their acquisition of business acumen, very much as was the case with whites. In the era of reconstruction following the civil war, black code legislation passed in 8 southern states struck at the heart of freemen's access to trades and Afro-American artisan enterprises by placing strict limits to black property rights and skilled craftsmanship.

The Freedman's Saving and Trust Company (FSTC), which grew out of the military banks where the wages of black soldiers had been deposited, and was created by Congress on March 3, 1865, was designed specifically to serve as a substitute for land grants, which had been foreclosed by violence and to counter the effects of post-war retrenchment of blacks in the South. It was considered the preferred vehicle for enabling blacks to save up and purchase land. One of its institutional aims was to tutor poor blacks and inculcate them with the virtues of thrift and planning for the future. Within a decade it garnered deposits totalling $75 million from 75,000 otherwise generally impoverished freedmen. A later amendment to its charter, which originally stipulated that the bank was to secure and safeguard deposits, and invest 2 thirds of the capital in government-backed securities, enabled white managers to effectively loot the bank by engaging in real estate speculations. The First National Bank shifted its own liabilities onto the FSTC's books while drawing on its deposits to buy worthless paper.

A 2019 study of 107,197 accounts in the FSTC archives found that access to the Freedman Saving's Bank significantly increased the schooling, literacy, employment, income, and real estate wealth of its depositors. The authors inferred that these accounts, spread over 27 Freedman's Bank branches, represented some 483,082 individuals in toto, that is roughly 12% of the Black population in the South in 1870. In the wake of the 1873 financial crisis, Frederick Douglass was appointed by the bank's trustees as its president, and, after investing $10,000 of his own money, discovered that the institution was crammed with "dead men's bones, rottenness and corruption". Congress on receiving his report had the bank's operations closed down on June 20, 1874, with the result that 61,113 depositors were denied access to their savings of $3 million. Speculative mismanagement burned half of the accumulated wealth accumulated by its black clients. W. E. B. Du Bois was to observe that, aside from ruining thousands of blacks, the experience drummed into many more a deep sense of institutional distrust of banks and the federal government among the Afro-American community. (Note: Du Bois claimed that "not even ten additional years of slavery could have done so much to throttle the thrift of the freedmen as the mismanagement and bankruptcy of the series of savings banks chartered by the Nation for their special aid." (Baradaran 2017, p. 31))

=== 1900-1960s ===
A core aim of the National Negro Business League under its president Booker T. Washington from its foundation in 1900 was to alleviate the plights of discrimination against blacks by encouraging economic self-sufficiency. It was thought that by embracing thrift, industry, and Christian values, rather than exercising political pressure to ameliorate their situation through legislative changes, that the social inferiority suffered by blacks could be gradually reduced. The choice of this priority would soon stir opposition from the ranks of the National Association for the Advancement of Colored People (1909) and among many upwardly mobile Afro-Americans. Leaders such as W. E. B. Du Bois represented their view that what this precedence effectively entailed was a tacit acquiescence in Afro-American inferiority. (Note: "Washington believed that blacks would be accepted as equals by whites only when they had acquired sufficient business acumen to successfully compete in the open market. His emphasis on literal black capitalism was a counterpoise to Du Bois' call for 'socialism without nationalism'-black cooperation rather than individual enterprise. As Du Bois saw it, 'Negro cooperative stores would obtain their goods from Negro producers, which would be supplied raw materials from Negro farmers. Intermediate stages of production such as extractive industries and transportation were to be Negro controlled" (Villemez & Beggs 1984, p. 119))} Du Bois eventually came round, however, to recognizing by the 1920s that black capitalism was both feasible as a project and a desirable goal.

The three decades from 1900 to 1930 have been called "the golden age of Black Business". A black entrepreneur like Annie Turnbo Malone succeeded in establishing a cosmetics industry that gave employment to some 75,000 Afro-Americans. One of the companies founded by the former slave John Merrick, the North Carolina Mutual Life Insurance Company became under the management of Charles Clinton Spaulding became the largest black-owned business in the United States. The life of the first female Afro-American banker Maggie Lena Walker tells a similar success story. These exemplary figures emphasized in their writings and activities the necessity for business to face its social responsibilities.

The G.I. Bill, which took up 15% of the entire federal budget by 1948 and which enabled, via low-cost mortgages and educational benefits, large numbers of lower class white Americans to rise into the middle class, was so structured or interpreted that its benefits were not widely distributed to Afro-American veterans of World War 2. (Note: "Like all returning soldiers, African Americans expected to capitalize on the government spending program to secure education and jobs, build homes, and accrue savings to invest in new businesses or underwrite college educations for their children. Some Black veterans did reap these benefits, but discriminatory implementation of the GI Bill reinforced existing racial barriers for many others. Inequitable application of the law also served to maintain the historical income disparities between Black and white families. Through the median family income more than doubled between 1947 and 1963, the median income of Black families continuously comprised only half that of whites." (Rabig & Hill 2012, p. 23))

=== 1968–1980 ===
Following on recommendations by the National Advisory Commission on Civil Disorders in 1968 for major programmes to ameliorate the quality of ghetto life, and in response to Black radicalism, Nixon often spoke of black capitalism as a remedy for the ills besetting Afro-American communities during his 1968 presidential campaign. The idea had long enjoyed grassroots Afro-American support before Nixon put it on his agenda. (Note: This has been documented by Laura Warren Hill's study Strike the Hammer: The Black Freedom Struggle in Rochester, New York, 1940–1970, (2021. Notably in the 1964 Rochester race riot, which she focuses on, not all white-owned stores were looted or destroyed. The rioters spared any such store with a reputation for treating blacks with respect and not overcharging them for inferior quality goods (Lucander 2023, p. 1862).) He established an Office of Minority Business Enterprise (OMBE). Despite initial scepticism, it did improve the prospects of some minority firms, but given the small number of black entrepreneurs the overall effect was small, though it did generate widespread interest in the idea.

The measures taken by the Carter administration from 1977 to 1979 to improve technical training and facilitate loans for Afro-Americans, and in particular its SBA 8A set-aside program, led to black business's biggest period of growth. A fixed percentage of government contracts allocated to minority firms was mandated at all levels from federal to local agencies and the measure almost tripled government business with black firms ($1 to 2.7 billion by 1980).

=== 1980s ===
The impact of Carter's policies declined rapidly under the succeeding Reagan administration. which was opposed to affirmative action quotas and goals, and trimmed SBA funding. Though first passed by Congress during the final year of Carter's administration (1980), the enterprise zones developed from the 1980s onwards had a marginal impact. (Note: One study found that 155 such zones had a negligible impact of employment. One such case, in Watts succeeded in creating a mere 159 jobs, with virtually no associated business growth (Hutchinson 1993, pp. 19–20).) Eleanor Holmes Norton, for one, dismissed them as evasive schemes by government to avoid spending on the poor and developing areas suffering from urban decay.

The politically activist NAACP's reaction to this sea-change in government policy was to re-embrace the recipé outlined by Booker Washington and others in the early 1900s, namely self-help. The return to first principles was bolstered by the impressive growth of a black middle class, with a sharp rise in its purchasing power, and lessons it thought it might learn from the successes experienced by other groups, in particular the recent immigrant communities of Koreans, Vietnamese and Cubans, together with the example set by American Jews. The common factor discerned in these groups was that they all provided access to credit and capital, as well as technical know-how, for members of their communities. The utility of such models has been questioned: despite appearances, many of these newcomers were professionals, with high education and had access to credit systems and, as refugees from communism, were amply funded as such via federal resettlement programs. (Note: The combined assets ($2.4 billion) of the largest Cuban-owned banks in Miami exceeded, in the early 1990s, the total assets of all 36 black-owned banks in the United States (Hutchinson 1993, p. 17))

=== Critical overviews ===
Ralph Bunche discerned in the fragility of black capitalism its dependence on a credit system monopolized by the white class, which, in his view, tolerated this enclave in its larger structure only on sufferance. Earl Ofari Hutchinson argues that historically, a core problem in the economics of Afro-American communities has been that they are not structured to retain capital, a fact exacerbated by the powerful grip major corporations exercise over domestic markets. The chronic outflow of wealth, he concluded, made black areas subject to a kind of 'domestic colonialism'. One further drawback noted by Andrew Brimmer, speaking as a member of the Federal Reserve Board of Governors is that black entrepreneurial activities were concentrated in industries that are subject to slow growth.

In a keynote address before the National Black Economic Development Conference in 1969, the economist Robert S. Browne argued that the lack of empowerment of black communities was grounded in their exclusion from what he identified as the six core bases of the American economy (a) huge personal wealth, (b) the top 22 major corporations, (c) the military-industrial complex, (d) the federal and state governmental apparatus, (e) the federal legislative apparatus, and (f) the crime syndicate.

Marxists, on the premise that race loyalties subvert class loyalties and interracial solidarity, have argued against the view that benefits can accrue to a black community through individual black entrepreneurial activities, and that "buy black" endorsements only favour members of the Afro-American bourgeoisie. The only result of such a stance would be to replace white with black exploitation of blacks. (Note: the beneficiaries of such policies would only lead to the exit of blacks with upper mobility and, with them, the wealth they have accumulated (Villemez & Beggs 1984, p. 122).) One compelling non-ideological argument, advanced by Sar Levitan and others advanced against the advantages attributed to black capitalism development holds that "an increase in wages and salaries of 2 percent could have more effect on the total income of the average Negro than a 100 percent increase in the profits he presently receives".

=== Economic disparity ===
Blacks on average have a lower net worth than whites in America. This is especially pertinent in the creation of new businesses. One of the most common forms of collateral for loans to open businesses is home equity. With the historical and current differences in lending patterns toward blacks and whites, the option of using home equity to borrow against in order to open a business is diminished.

Writing for the Huffington Post on "America's Financial Divide", Anthony Moore states

...nearly 96.1 percent of the 1.2 million households in the top one percent by income were white, a total of about 1,150,000 households. In addition, these families were found to have a median net asset worth of $8.3 million dollars. In stark contrast, in the same piece black households were shown as a mere 1.4 percent of the top one percent by income, that's only 16,800 homes. In addition, their median net asset worth was just $1.2 million dollars. Using this data as an indicator only about 8,400 of the over 14 million African American households have more than $1.2 million dollars in net assets...Relying on data from Credit Suisse and Brandeis University's Institute on Assets and Social Policy, the Harvard Business Review in the article "How America's Wealthiest Black Families Invest Money" recently took the analysis above a step further. In the piece the author stated "If you're white and have a net worth of about $356,000, that's good enough to put you in the 72nd percentile of white families. If you're black, it's good enough to catapult you into the 95th percentile." This means 28 percent of the total 83 million white homes, or over 23 million white households, have more than $356,000 in net assets. While only 700,000 of the 14 million black homes have more than $356,000 in total net worth.

== See also ==
- African-American socialism
- Black excellence
- Civil rights movement (1865–1896)
- Civil rights movement (1896–1954)
- African-American business history
- Timeline of the civil rights movement

== Related magazines and books ==
- Black Enterprise Magazine

== Sources ==
- Baradaran, Mehrsa (2017). The Colour of Money: Black Banks and the Racial Wealth Gap. Belknap Press. ISBN 978-0-674-97095-3.
- Bloch, Herman D. (June 1970). "Black Capitalism: Strategy for Business in The Ghetto (review)". Journal of Economic Literature. 8 (2): 489–491. JSTOR 2720509.
- "Chicago Booth study links Black distrust of financial institutions to Freedman's Bank collapse". UChicago News. September 11, 2020.
- Hill, Laura Warren (April 2021). Strike the Hammer: The Black Freedom Struggle in Rochester, New York, 1940-1970. Cornell University Press. ISBN 978-1-5017-5425-8.
- Hutchinson, Earl Ofari (Winter–Spring 1993). "The Continuing Myth of Black Capitalism". The Black Scholar. 23 (1): 16–21. doi:10.1080/00064246.1993.11413072. JSTOR 41069658.
- Kuznets, Solomon (April 1937). "Black Capitalism (review)". Journal of Negro Education. 6 (2): 191–193. doi:10.2307/2292256. JSTOR 2292256.
- Lucander, David (December 2023). "Strike the Hammer: The Black Freedom Struggle in Rochester, New York, 1940–1970 (review)". The American Historical Review. 128 (4): 1862–1863. doi:10.1093/ahr/rhad375.
- Moore, Anthony (August 5, 2014). "The Decadent Veil: Black America's Wealth Illusion". HuffPost.
- Nordhauser, Norman E. (Summer 1999). "The History of Black Business in America: Capitalism, Race, Entrepreneurship (review)". Journal of the Illinois State Historical Society. 92 (2): 173–181. JSTOR 40193214.
- Passell, Peter (May 25, 1994). "Sar A. Levitan, 79, Economist And Social Policy Scholar, Dies". Obituaries. The New York Times.
- Prieto, Leon C.; Phipps, Simone T.A. (April 7, 2021). "How 20th-Century Black Business Leaders Envisioned a More Just Capitalism". Harvard Business Review.
- Rabig, Julia; Hill, Laura Warren (2012). "Towards a History of the Business of Black Power". In Rabig, Julia; Hill, Laura Warren (eds.). The Business of Black Power: Community Development, Capitalism, and Corporate Responsibility in Postwar America. University of Rochester Press. pp. 15–42. ISBN 978-1-580-46403-1.
- Stein, Luke C. D.; Yannelis, Constantine (2019). Financial Inclusion, Human Capital, and Wealth Accumulation: Evidence from the Freedman's Savings Bank (PDF). W. P. Carey School of Business.
- Tate, Gayle T. (November 1998). "Prophesy and Transformation: The Contours of Lewis Woodson's Nationalism". Journal of Black Studies. 29 (2): 209–233. doi:10.1177/002193479802900205. JSTOR 2668090.
- Tolson, Arthur J. (April 1975). "Historical and Modern Trends in Black Capitalism". The Black Scholar. 6 (7): 8–14. doi:10.1080/00064246.1975.11413704. JSTOR 41066364.
- Villemez, Wayne J.; Beggs, John J. (September 1984). "Black Capitalism and Black Inequality: Some Sociological Considerations". Social Forces. 63 (1): 117–144. doi:10.2307/2578861. JSTOR 2578861.
- Walker, Juliet E. K. (2009) [First published 1998]. The History of Black Business in America: Capitalism, Race, Entrepreneurship (2nd ed.). Twayne Publishers. ISBN 978-0-807-83241-7.
- Weems, Jr, Robert E; Randolph, Lewis A. (September 2001). "The National Response to Richard M. Nixon's Black Capitalism Initiative: The Success of Domestic Detente". Journal of Black Studies. 32 (1): 66–83. doi:10.1177/002193470103200104. JSTOR 2668015.
