= 1968 New Jersey Democratic presidential primary =

1968 New Jersey Democratic presidential primaries
- June 4, 1968
- Presidential delegate primary

82 Democratic National Convention delegates

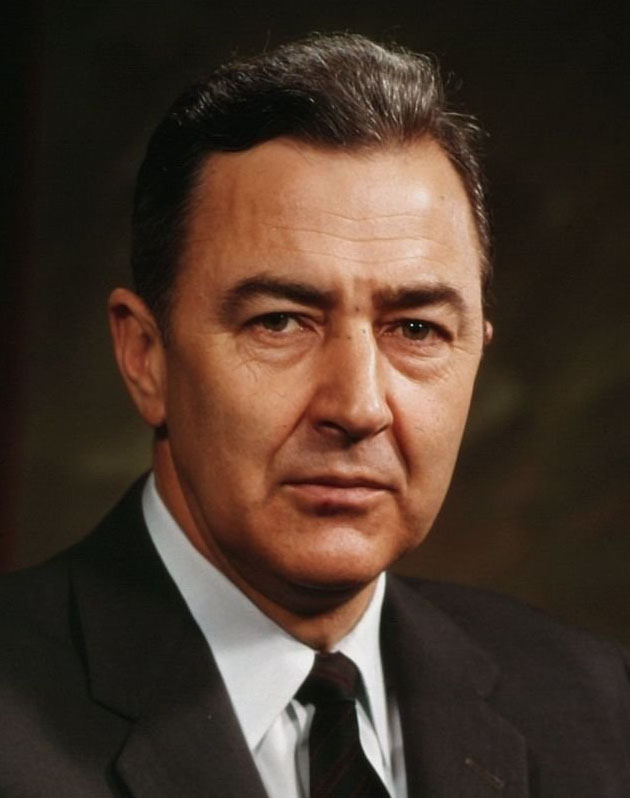
Candidate	Uncommitted	Eugene McCarthy
Home state		Minnesota
Delegate count	61	19
Popular vote	200,986	95,837
Percentage	62.4%	29.7%
- Presidential preference primary (non-binding)

No Democratic National Convention delegates
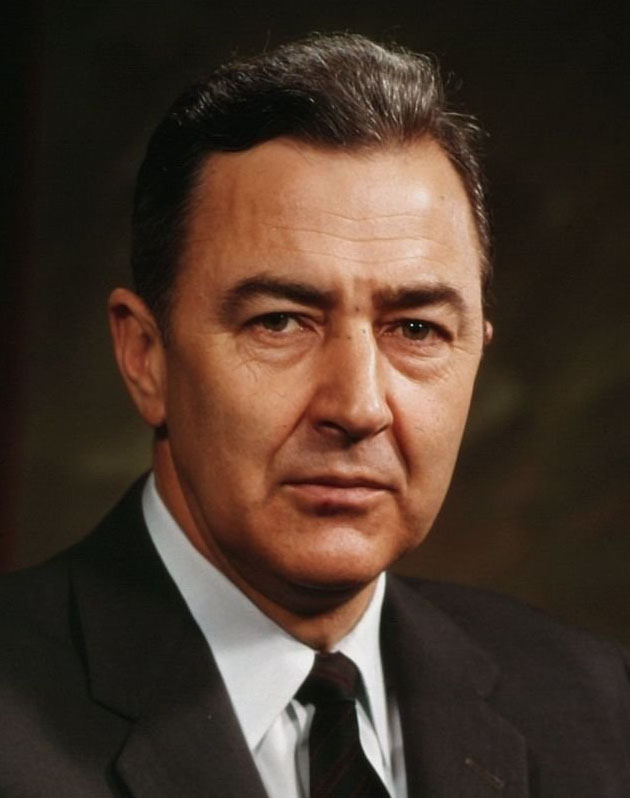

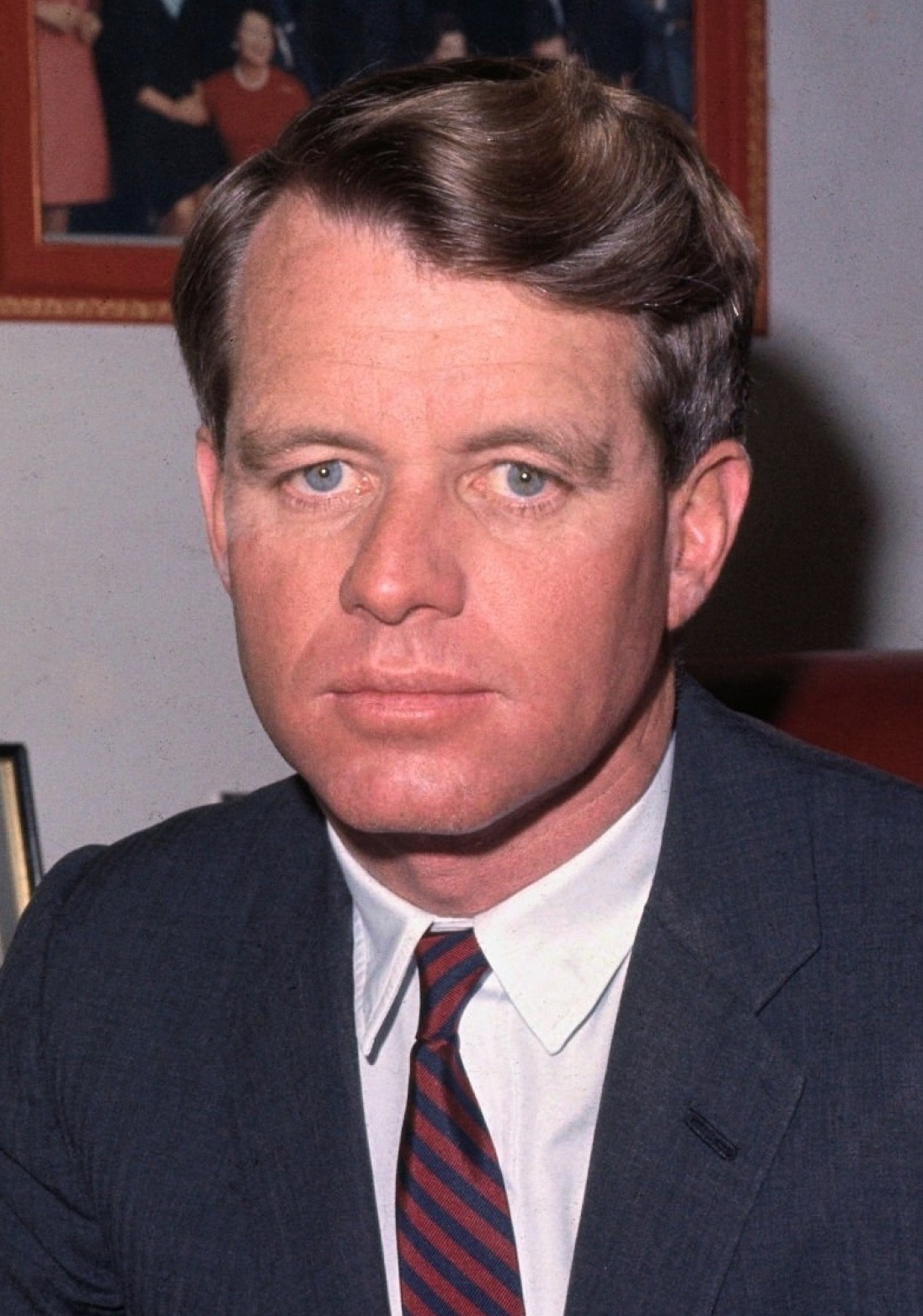

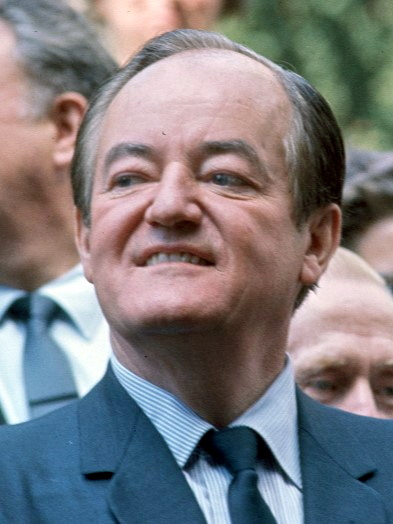

Candidate	Eugene McCarthy (write-in)	Robert F. Kennedy (write-in)	Hubert Humphrey (write-in)
Home state	Minnesota	New York	Minnesota
Popular vote	9,906	8,603	5,578
Percentage	36.1%	31.3%	20.3%
Candidate	George Wallace (write-in)	Richard Nixon (write-in)
Home state	Alabama	New York
Popular vote	1,399	1,364
Percentage	5.1%	5.0%

The 1968 New Jersey Democratic presidential primary was held on June 4, 1968, in New Jersey as one of the Democratic Party's statewide nomination contests ahead of the 1968 United States presidential election.

In the binding delegate primary, uncommitted delegates won a large majority over delegates pledged to support Eugene McCarthy. McCarthy captured nineteen delegates by narrowly winning several of the state's suburban congressional districts, including nine out of ten delegates from Bergen County. The uncommitted delegates were expected to determine internally whether to support Hubert Humphrey or Robert F. Kennedy. However, Kennedy was assassinated on the night of the primary, leading the New Jersey delegation to support Humphrey at the convention.

In the preference primary held at the same time, McCarthy won with 36.1 percent of the vote. However, no candidate appeared on the ballot and far fewer voters participated in the write-in preference primary, which had no binding effect on the delegates.

== Background ==
=== Primary campaign ===
After Lyndon B. Johnson announced on March 31 that he would not seek or accept the Democratic nomination for president, Democratic leaders in New Jersey formed an uncommitted "Regular Democratic Organization" slate. Ahead of the April 25 filing deadline, only Minnesota senator Eugene McCarthy fielded an opposing slate of delegates; his chief competitors, Hubert Humphrey and Robert F. Kennedy, chose not to enter the New Jersey primary and instead focus on swaying the party leaders and uncommitted delegates once elected.

=== Procedure ===
Five delegates were elected at-large with five more elected from each of the state's congressional districts. Delegates were elected individually, rather than as a slate, with each voter selecting up to five choices in each race. They were permitted to run as pledged or unpledged delegates. Typically, the state and county party organizations attempted to elect unpledged slates. In addition, New Jersey's two Democratic National Committee members were entitled to a delegate seat ex officio.

In addition to the delegate election, a nonbinding preference poll was held, as had been in every presidential year since 1912, with the exceptions of 1948, 1960 and 1964. The preference primary was often disregarded by convention delegates.

The filing deadline was April 25. In 1965, the legislature rescheduled the primary date from the third Tuesday in April to the first Tuesday in June.

== Candidates ==
- Jesse Gray, New York City tenants' advocate
- Hubert Humphrey, Vice President of the United States and former U.S. senator from Minnesota
- Robert F. Kennedy, U.S. senator from New York and former U.S. Attorney General
- Eugene McCarthy, U.S. senator from Minnesota

=== Withdrew ===
- Lyndon B. Johnson, President of the United States

== Results ==
=== Preference primary results ===
1968 New Jersey presidential preference primary
Party	Candidate	Votes	%
Democratic	Eugene McCarthy (write-in)	9,906	36.09%
Democratic	Robert F. Kennedy (write-in)	8,603	31.35%
Democratic	Hubert Humphrey (write-in)	5,578	20.32%
Democratic	George Wallace (write-in)	1,399	5.10%
Republican	Richard Nixon (write-in)	1,364	4.97%
Democratic	Lyndon B. Johnson (write-in)	380	1.38%
Republican	Nelson Rockefeller (write-in)	176	0.64%
Republican	Ronald Reagan (write-in)	40	0.15%
Total votes		27,446	100.00%

=== Delegate primary results ===
1968 New Jersey Democratic primary
Delegate slate	Candidate	Delegate candidates		Delegates		Aggregate votes	
Delegate slate	Candidate	State	County	Total	Of total (%)	Total	Of total (%)
Other/Uncommitted		10	88	61	76.25	2,070,819	67.68
McCarthy for President	Eugene McCarthy	5	75	19	23.75	953,016	31.15
Jesse Gray for President	Jesse Gray	5	5	0	0.0	35,773	1.17
Total		20	168	80	100.0	3,059,608	100.00
Registered voters, and turnout							

==== Delegate primary results by contest ====
1968 New Jersey Democratic primary
Contest	Delegates and popular vote				Total
Contest	Uncommitted (Note: Uncommitted totals in the county elections are the totals of the top slate of uncommitted delegate candidates. Additional delegate candidates are listed under "other".)	McCarthy	Gray	Other	Total
Delegates at-large	5; 1,004,931 (62.36%)	479,185 (29.74%)	32,817 (2.04%)	94,584 (5.87%) (Note: All votes cast for the "United Democrats" slate led by Frank Hague Eggers Jr.)	1,611,517
1st district	5; 57,161 (71.61%)	22,657 (28.39%)	—N/a	—N/a	79,818
2nd district	5; 33,609 (74.05%)	11,333 (24.97%)	—N/a	446 (0.98%) (Note: All votes cast for Joseph T. Wilkins, running with the slogan "Challenge '68".)	45,388
3rd district	5; 53,072 (66.08%)	27,246 (33.92%)	—N/a	—N/a	80,318
4th district	5; 42,033 (52.54%)	37,657 (47.07%)	—N/a	317 (0.39%) (Note: All votes cast for Thomas D. Walsh, running with no slogan.)	80,007
5th district	37,269 (47.08%)	5; 41,890 (52.92%)	—N/a	—N/a	79,159
6th district	5; 46,449 (60.09%)	30,849 (39.91%)	—N/a	—N/a	77,298
7th district	1; 36,362 (49.30%)	4; 37,397 (50.70%)	—N/a	—N/a	73,759
8th district	5; 40,075 (65.39%)	21,210 (34.61%)	—N/a	—N/a	61,285
9th district	42,716 (48.50%)	5; 45,360 (51.50%)	—N/a	—N/a	88,076
10th district	5; 63,169 (69.74%)	27,411 (30.26%)	—N/a	—N/a	90,580
11th district	5; 61,345 (62.38%)	36,240 (36.85%)	—N/a	762 (0.77%) (Note: All votes cast for Robert R. Detore, running with no slogan.)	98,347
12th district	42,676 (47.33%)	5; 47,485 (52.67%)	—N/a	—N/a	90,161
13th district	5; 139,502 (71.87%)	26,503 (13.65%)	2,956 (1.52%)	25,137 (12.95%) (Note: All votes cast for the "United Democrats" slate led by Edward Muzikowski.)	194,098
14th district	5; 131,553 (71.87%)	23,037 (12.59%)	—N/a	28,449 (15.54%) (Note: All votes cast for the "United Democrats" slate led by Edward Lombardi.)	183,039
15th district	5; 89,202 (70.37%)	37,556 (29.63%)	—N/a	—N/a	126,758
District subtotal	56 916,193 (63.27%)	19 473,831 (32.72%)	2,956 (0.20%)	55,111 (3.81%)	1,448,091

== Aftermath ==
At the 1968 Democratic National Convention, New Jersey cast 62 votes for Humphrey and 18 for McCarthy on the first ballot. One delegate who had been pledged to McCarthy, Fairleigh Dickinson economic professor Robert S. Browne, cast his vote for Channing E. Phillips.
