= 1968 Democratic Party presidential primaries =

Selection of Democratic US presidential candidate

- March 12 to June 11, 1968

2,607 delegates to the Democratic National Convention 1,304 (majority) votes needed to win
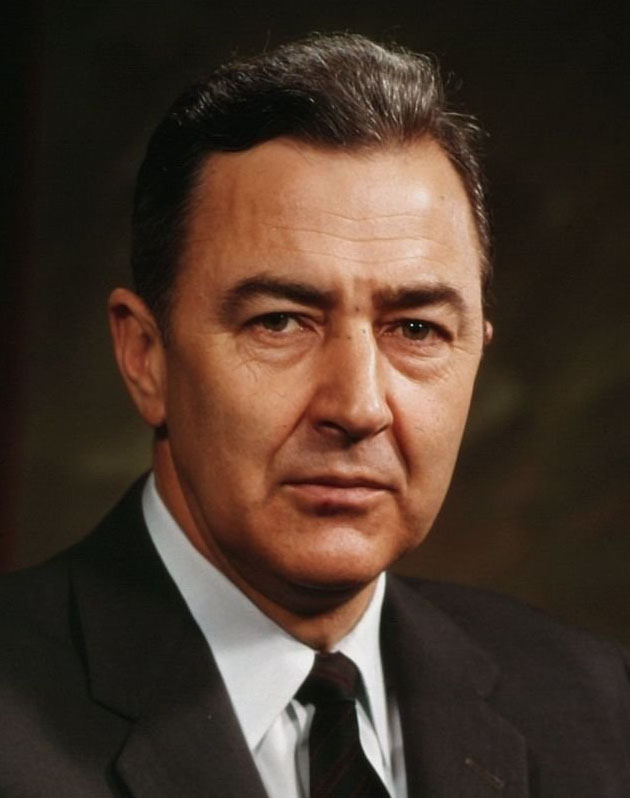

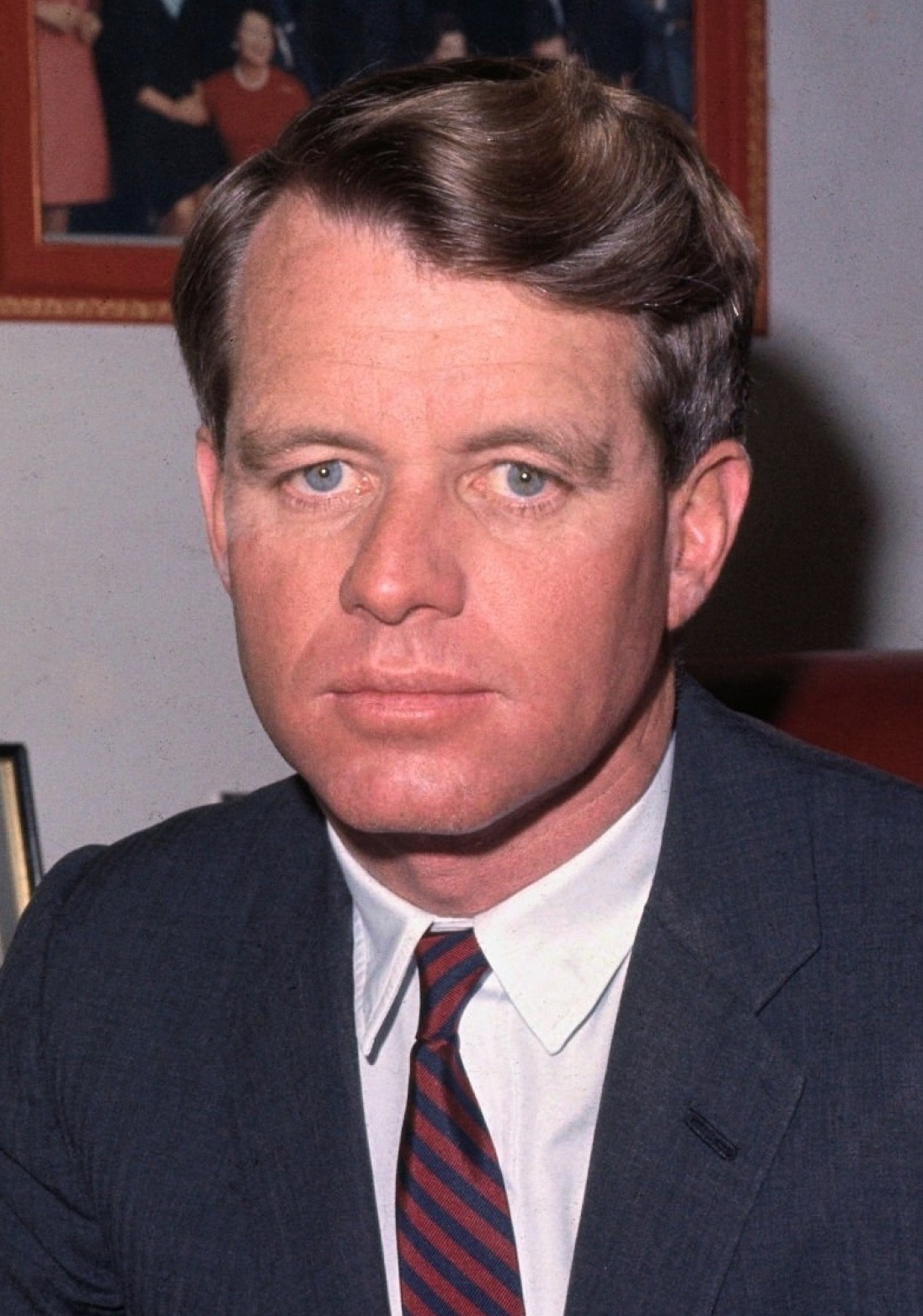

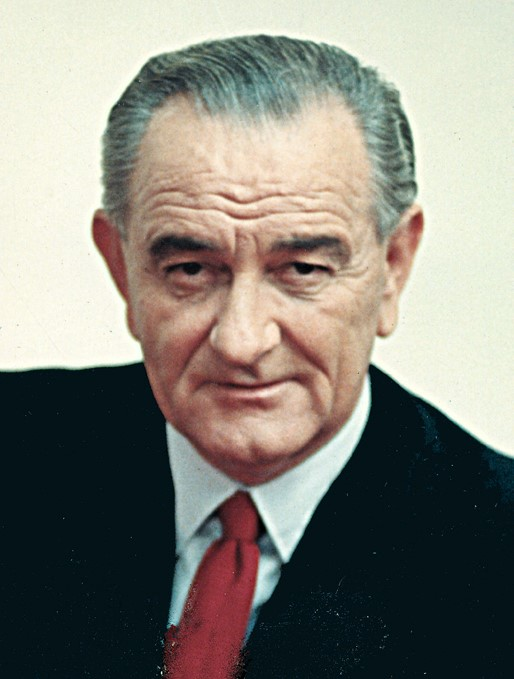
Candidate	Eugene McCarthy	Robert F. Kennedy†
Home state	Minnesota	New York
Delegate count	379.2; 487.5 (Note: Highest estimated delegate strength)	340.5; 393.5
Contests won	6	5
Popular vote	2,914,933	2,305,148
Percentage	38.7%	30.6%
Candidate	Hubert Humphrey	Lyndon B. Johnson (Note: Johnson withdrew from the race on March 31, 1968, after the New Hampshire primary, and endorsed his vice president, Hubert Humphrey.)
Home state	Minnesota	Texas
Delegate count	258; 1,159.5	12
Contests won	0	1
Popular vote	166,463	383,590
Percentage	2.2%	5.1%
- Humphrey McCarthy Kennedy† Johnson; McGovern Phillips Favorite Sons (Note: Favorite sons received the support of Ohio (Stephen Young), Florida (George Smathers), New Jersey (Richard Hughes), South Carolina (Robert McNair), North Carolina (Dan Moore), Maine (Edmund Muskie), Texas (John Connally), Louisiana (John McKeithen), Tennessee (Buford Ellington) and Virginia (Mills Godwin).) Uncommitted
Previous Democratic nominee
Lyndon B. Johnson
Democratic nominee
Hubert Humphrey

From March to July 1968, Democratic Party voters elected delegates to the 1968 Democratic National Convention for the purpose of selecting the party's nominee for president in the upcoming election. Delegates, and the nominee they were to support at the convention, were selected through a series of primary elections, caucuses, and state party conventions. This was the last time that state primary elections formed a minority (12 states) of the selection process, as the McGovern–Fraser Commission, which issued its recommendations in time for the 1972 Democratic Party presidential primaries, would dramatically reform the nomination process to expand the use of popular primaries rather than caucuses.

After an inconclusive and tumultuous campaign focused on the Vietnam War, completely upheavaled by the June assassination of Robert F. Kennedy, incumbent Vice President Hubert Humphrey was nominated at the 1968 Democratic National Convention held from August 26 to August 29, 1968, in Chicago, Illinois.

The campaign for the nomination began with incumbent President Lyndon B. Johnson expected to win re-nomination for a second consecutive election, despite low approval ratings following the Tet Offensive in January 1968. His only significant challenger was Eugene McCarthy, an anti-war Senator from Minnesota. After McCarthy nearly won the New Hampshire primary on March 12, Senator Robert F. Kennedy, another critic of the war and the brother of the late President John F. Kennedy, entered the race on March 16. On March 31, Johnson announced that he would not seek re-election. In April, Vice President Hubert H. Humphrey joined the race as the establishment candidate; he did not criticize the administration's conduct of the war and avoided the popular contests for delegates.

McCarthy and Kennedy traded primary victories while Humphrey collected delegates through the closed caucus and convention systems in place in most states. Many other delegates were selected without a formal commitment to support any particular candidate. The race was upended on June 5, the night of the California and South Dakota primaries. Both races went for Kennedy, but he was assassinated after his victory speech at the Ambassador Hotel. At the moment of his assassination, Kennedy trailed Humphrey in the pledged delegate count with McCarthy third. Without any obligation to vote for any candidate, most Kennedy delegates backed Humphrey over McCarthy or fell behind Kennedy supporter George McGovern.

At the convention, Humphrey secured the nomination easily despite anti-war riots outside the convention center; he went on to lose the presidential election to Richard Nixon. Humphrey would be the last Democratic nominee to be nominated despite not actively campaigning in the primaries until Kamala Harris in the 2024 United States presidential election.

== Background ==
=== 1960 and 1964 presidential elections ===
In 1960, John F. Kennedy won the Democratic nomination over Lyndon B. Johnson. After he secured the nomination at the party convention, Kennedy offered Johnson the vice presidential nomination; the offer was a surprise, and some Kennedy supporters claimed that the nominee expected Johnson to decline. Robert F. Kennedy, the nominee's brother and campaign manager, reportedly went to Johnson's hotel suite to dissuade Johnson from accepting. Johnson accepted, and the Kennedy-Johnson ticket was narrowly elected, but the 1960 campaign intensified the personal enmity between Robert F. Kennedy and Lyndon B. Johnson, which dated to as early as 1953. President Kennedy named his brother to his cabinet as United States Attorney General.

President Kennedy was assassinated on November 22, 1963; Johnson succeeded him with tremendous national popularity amid a wave of mourning and sympathy. Robert Kennedy remained in the cabinet for several months, creating what Johnson staffers began to refer to as "the Bobby problem": despite the personal hatred between the two, Democratic voters overwhelmingly favored Kennedy as Johnson's running mate in the 1964 election. Kennedy began to plan for a nationwide campaign, and in the informal New Hampshire vice-presidential primary, Kennedy defeated Hubert H. Humphrey in a landslide.

In July 1964, Johnson issued an official statement ruling out any cabinet member for the vice presidency. In search of a way out of the dilemma, Kennedy asked speechwriter Milton Gwirtzman to write a memo comparing two offices: 1) governor of Massachusetts and 2) U.S. senator from New York, and "which would be a better place from which to make a run for the presidency in future years?" In September, Kennedy resigned as attorney general, and ran for and won election to the U.S. Senate. Johnson was elected in a landslide.

=== Vietnam War ===
United States involvement in the Vietnam War began shortly after the end of World War II. Beginning in 1964, President Johnson dramatically escalated American military presence after the Gulf of Tonkin incident. On the recommendation of General William C. Westmoreland, whom Johnson had appointed to command American troops in Vietnam, U.S. manpower in Southeast Asia expanded from 16,000 in 1964 to more than 553,000 by 1969.

As U.S. involvement escalated throughout 1964 to 1966, protests against the war escalated in proportion. Several anti-war groups were founded or expanded during the period.

=== 1966 midterms and "Dump Johnson" movement ===
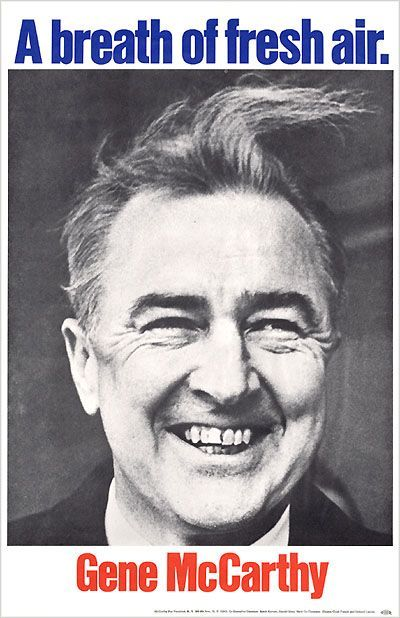
Anti-war Senator Eugene McCarthy agreed to challenge President Johnson in October 1967, after several better-known candidates (including Robert Kennedy) declined to run.

Amid criticism of U.S. handling of the war from both parties, President Johnson's approval rating sank from a high above 70 percent to below 40 percent by the 1966 midterm elections. The Democratic Party had already begun to split between anti-war "doves" and pro-war "hawks," and the Republican Party gained dozens of seats in Congress.

As opposition grew in 1967, anti-war Democrats led by Allard Lowenstein and Curtis Gans formed the Dump Johnson movement, which sought to challenge the President's re-election. Their first choice was Robert Kennedy, who had sufficiently established himself as a critic of the war and an effective popular campaigner. He declined, as did a series of lesser-known candidates, including Senator George McGovern. Lowenstein finally found a candidate in October 1967, when Minnesota Senator Eugene McCarthy agreed to challenge the President. At first, McCarthy merely expressed his interest, telling Lowenstein, "Somebody has to raise the flag." On November 30, 1967, McCarthy publicly announced his campaign for the nomination.

Kennedy continued to demur, despite pressure from his aides to enter the race and worry that anti-war allies, like George McGovern, would begin to make commitments to McCarthy. On January 30, he again indicated to the press that he had no plans to campaign against Johnson.

In early February 1968, after the Tet Offensive in Vietnam, Kennedy received an anguished letter from writer Pete Hamill, noting that poor people in the Watts area of Los Angeles had hung pictures of Kennedy's brother, President John F. Kennedy, in their homes. Hamill's letter reminded Robert Kennedy that he had an "obligation of staying true to whatever it was that put those pictures on those walls." There were other factors that influenced Kennedy's decision to enter the presidential primary race. On February 29, 1968, the Kerner Commission issued a report on the racial unrest that had affected American cities during the previous summer. The Kerner Commission blamed "white racism" for the violence, but its findings were largely dismissed by the Johnson administration.

On March 10, Kennedy told his aide, Peter Edelman, that he had decided to run and had to "figure out how to get McCarthy out of it." Nevertheless, Kennedy hesitated to publicly enter the race with McCarthy still in and agreed to McCarthy's request to delay an announcement of his intentions until after the New Hampshire primary. However, a phone conversation between President Johnson and Chicago mayor Richard J. Daley on January 27, 1968 revealed that Daley had knowledge of Kennedy's intentions to run for President by that time, with Daley telling Johnson that Kennedy met with him and sought his support, which he declined.

== Candidates ==
The following political leaders were candidates for the 1968 Democratic presidential nomination:

=== Nominee ===
Candidate	Born	Most recent office	Home state	Campaign Withdrawal date	Popular vote	Contests won	Delegates won	Running mate
Hubert Humphrey	May 27, 1911 (age 57); Wallace, South Dakota	Vice President of the United States (1965–1969)	Minnesota	(Campaign); Declared: April 27, 1968; Secured nomination: August 29, 1968	166,463 (2.2%)	0 (Note: Humphrey entered the race too late to participate in the primaries. Humphrey initially expected to remain as Johnson's running mate for reelection prior to Johnson's withdrawal on March 31, 1968.)	1759.25 (67.4%)	Edmund Muskie

=== Eliminated at convention ===
Candidate	Born	Most recent office	Home state	Campaign Withdrawal date	Popular vote	Contests won	Delegates won	Running mate
Eugene McCarthy	March 29, 1916 (age 52); Watkins, Minnesota	U.S. Senator from Minnesota (1959–1971)	Minnesota	(Campaign); Declared: November 30, 1967; Defeated at convention: August 29, 1968	2,914,933 (38.7%)	6	601 (23.0%)	None
George McGovern	July 19, 1922 (age 45); Avon, South Dakota	U.S. Senator from South Dakota (1963–1981)	South Dakota	(Campaign); Announced: July 23, 1968 (Note: McGovern entered the race following Robert Kennedy's assassination.); Defeated at convention: August 29, 1968	0 (0%)	0	146.5 (5.6%)	None

=== Other major candidates ===
These candidates participated in multiple state primaries or were included in multiple major national polls.

Candidate	Born	Most recent office	Home state	Campaign Withdrawal date	Popular vote	Contests won	Running mate
Lyndon B. Johnson	August 27, 1908 (age 59); Stonewall, Texas	President of the United States (1963–1969)	Texas	(Campaign); Withdrew: March 31, 1968 (endorsed Humphrey)	383,590 (5.10%)	1	Hubert Humphrey
Robert F. Kennedy	November 20, 1925 (age 42); Brookline, Massachusetts	U.S. Senator from New York (1965–1968)	New York	(Campaign); Declared: March 16, 1968; Assassinated: June 5, 1968	2,305,148 (30.6%)	5	None

=== Favorite sons ===
The following candidates ran only in their home state or district's primary or caucuses for the purpose of controlling its delegate slate at the convention and did not appear to be considered national candidates by the media.

- Governor Roger D. Branigin of Indiana (endorsed Humphrey)
- Governor Richard J. Hughes of New Jersey (endorsed Humphrey)
- State Attorney General Thomas C. Lynch of California (endorsed Humphrey)
- Governor Robert Evander McNair of South Carolina
- Governor Dan Moore of North Carolina
- Senator Edmund Muskie of Maine
- Representative Joseph Resnick of Westchester County, New York
- Senator George Smathers of Florida (endorsed Humphrey)
- Senator Stephen M. Young of Ohio (endorsed Humphrey)

=== Declined to run ===
The following persons were listed in two or more major national polls or were the subject of media speculation surrounding their potential candidacy, but declined to actively seek the nomination.

- Senator Ted Kennedy of Massachusetts
- Former Governor George Wallace of Alabama (ran third-party campaign)

== Polling ==
=== Nationwide polling ===
Poll source	Publication	Hubert Humphrey	Lyndon B. Johnson	Robert F. Kennedy	Eugene McCarthy
Gallup	Feb. 1966	5%	52%	27%	–
Gallup	Aug. 1966	6%	38%	40%	–
Gallup	Jan. 1967	8%	34%	43%	–
Gallup	Sep. 1967	6%	37%	39%	–
Newsweek	Jan. 7, 1968	–	74.3%	–	16.7%
Theodore H. White	Jan. 10, 1968	–	79%	–	12%
Newsweek	Jan. 21, 1968	–	73%	–	18%
U.S. News & World Report	Jan. 22, 1968	–	66.7%	–	24.3%
Newsweek	Jan. 28, 1968	–	80%	–	11%
New York Times/CBS	Feb. 1, 1968	–	71%	–	20%
Theodore H. White	Feb. 10, 1968	–	73%	–	18%
Newsweek	Feb. 25, 1968	–	76.7%	–	14.3%
U.S. News & World Report	Feb. 26, 1968	–	76.2%	–	14.8%
New York Times/CBS	Feb. 29, 1968	–	77%	–	14%
Newsweek	Mar. 3, 1968	–	69%	–	20%
U.S. News & World Report	Mar. 5, 1968	–	65%	–	30%
Theodore H. White	Mar. 10, 1968	–	65.5%	–	26.5%
March 12: New Hampshire primary
March 16: Robert F. Kennedy enters the race
New York Times/CBS	Mar. 21, 1968	–	50%	–	41%
U.S. News & World Report	Mar. 24, 1968	–	39%	–	52%
March 31: Johnson withdraws
New York Times/CBS	Apr. 4, 1968	–	12%	–	79%
Gallup	Apr. 9, 1968	31%	–	35%	23%
Gallup	Apr. 23, 1968	25%	–	28%	33%
April 27: Hubert Humphrey enters the race
Gallup	May 7, 1968	40%	–	31%	19%
June 5: Robert F. Kennedy is assassinated
Gallup	July 23, 1968	53%	–	–	39%

== Campaign ==
=== March: New Hampshire, Kennedy enters, Johnson withdraws ===
Running as an antiwar candidate in the New Hampshire presidential primary, McCarthy hoped to pressure the Democrats into publicly opposing the Vietnam War. Trailing badly in national polls and with little chance to influence delegate selection absent primary wins, McCarthy decided to pour most of his resources into New Hampshire, the first state to hold a primary election. He was boosted by thousands of young college students who volunteered throughout the state, who shaved their beards and cut their hair to "Get Clean for Gene."

On March 12, McCarthy was the only person on the ballot, as Johnson had not filed, and was only a write in candidate. McCarthy won 42% of the primary vote to Johnson's 50%, an extremely strong showing for such a challenger which gave McCarthy's campaign legitimacy and momentum. In addition, McCarthy's superior coordination led to a near sweep of the state's twenty-four pledged delegates; since Johnson had no formal campaign organization in the state, a number of competing pro-Johnson delegate candidates split his vote, allowing McCarthy to take twenty delegates.

Despite his desire to oppose Johnson directly and the fear that McCarthy would split the anti-war vote, Kennedy pushed forward with his planned campaign. On March 16, Kennedy declared, "I am today announcing my candidacy for the presidency of the United States. I do not run for the presidency merely to oppose any man, but to propose new policies. I run because I am convinced that this country is on a perilous course and because I have such strong feelings about what must be done, and I feel that I'm obliged to do all I can." However, due to his late entry, Kennedy's name would not appear on a state ballot until the Indiana primary on May 7.

In their January 27, 1968 phone conservation, Daley and Johnson detailed how they had initially intended to feed Kennedy's ego and make it seem like his campaign was creating a "revolution." Johnson at the time had agreed to accept Daley's proposal to either stay in the race or drop out and run as Hubert Humphrey's Vice President.

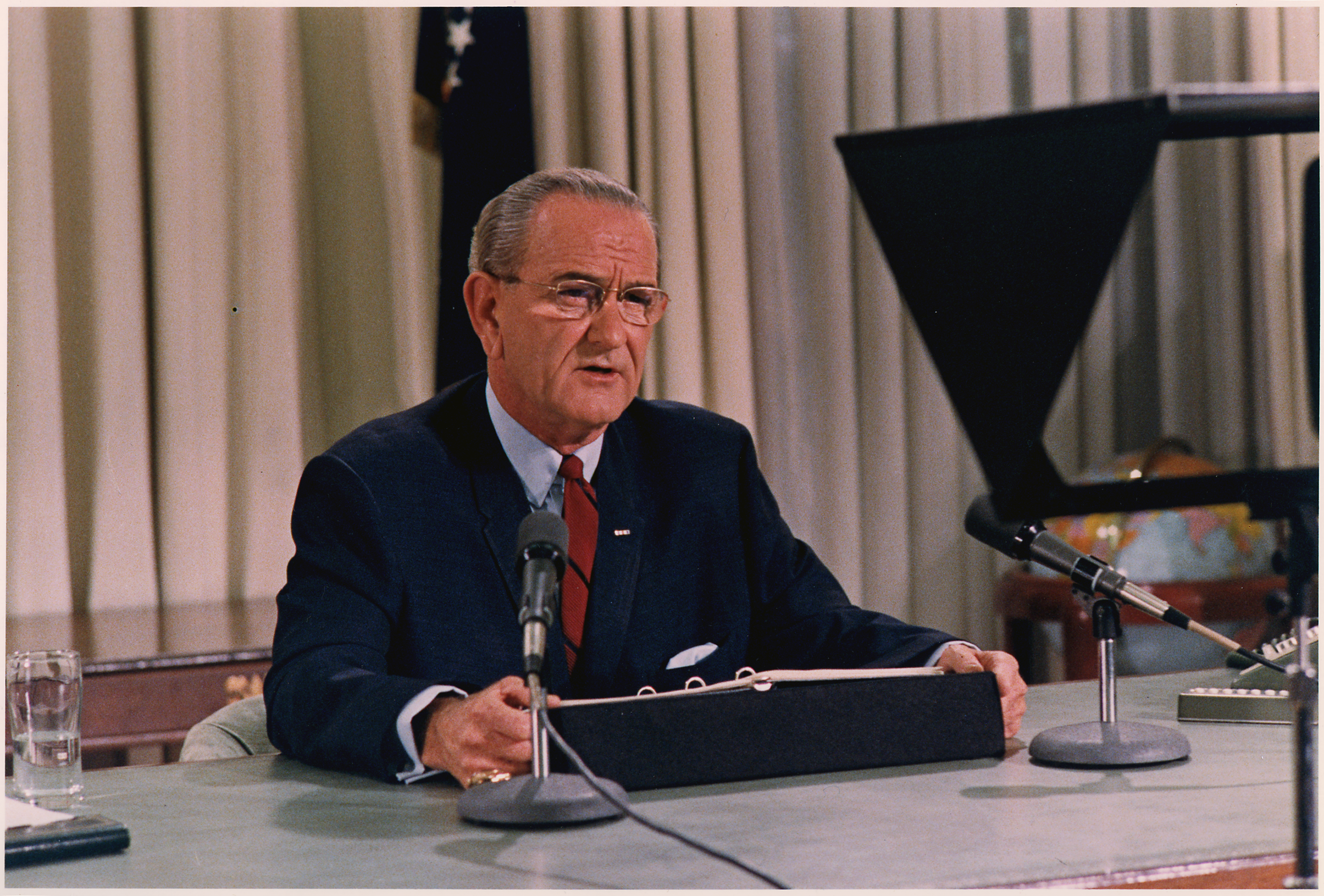
President Lyndon B. Johnson delivers a speech announcing he will not run for re-election on March 31.

Johnson now had two strong challengers, sitting members of the Senate with demonstrated popularity. To make matters worse, polling in Wisconsin showed McCarthy beating Johnson badly, with the latter getting only 12% of the vote. Facing declining health and bleak political forecasts in the upcoming primaries, Johnson concluded that he could not win the nomination without a major political and personal struggle. On March 31, 1968, at the end of a televised address on Vietnam, he shocked the nation by announcing that he would not seek re-election. By withdrawing, he could avoid the stigma of defeat and could keep control of the party machinery to support Vice President Hubert Humphrey. As the year developed, it also became clear that Johnson believed he could secure his place in the history books by ending the war before the election in November, which would give Humphrey the boost he would need to win.

With Johnson out of the race, Democratic support split between four candidates: McCarthy, Kennedy, Humphrey (who had not yet declared himself a candidate), and former Alabama governor George Wallace, running as a third-party candidate. McCarthy rallied students and intellectuals, who had been the early activists against the war in Vietnam. Kennedy gained support from the poor, Catholics, African Americans, Hispanic Americans, and other racial and ethnic minorities. Humphrey gained the support of labor unions and big-city bosses, such as Chicago Mayor Richard J. Daley. Conservative Democrats, especially in the South, tended to support either Humphrey or Wallace.

=== April: McCarthy triumphant, Humphrey enters ===
The Wisconsin primary on April 2 was effectively uncontested. McCarthy received 56% of the vote. Kennedy received 6% as a write-in candidate. Kennedy was ineligible for the ballot because he entered the race following the filing deadline. The Pennsylvania primary on April 23 was similarly a rout for McCarthy, who took 71% of the vote.

After Johnson's withdrawal, Vice President Hubert Humphrey announced his candidacy on April 27. Humphrey's campaign concentrated on winning the delegates in non-primary states, where party leaders controlled the delegate votes. Humphrey did not compete in the primaries, leaving favorite sons to win delegates as surrogates, notably Senator George A. Smathers from Florida, Senator Stephen M. Young from Ohio, and Indiana governor Roger D. Branigin.

In the Massachusetts primary on April 30 neither Humphrey nor Kennedy were formally listed on the ballot. As a result, McCarthy won the popular vote easily, and by the rules in place at the time, all 72 of the commonwealth's delegates were pledged to him on the first ballot. Some analysts viewed Humphrey's unexpectedly strong showing (44,156 write-in votes, or 18% of the total) as a clear victory over Kennedy, a Brookline, Massachusetts native, who polled a meager 28% write-in vote in his family's home state.

=== May: Kennedy momentum, McCarthy in Oregon ===
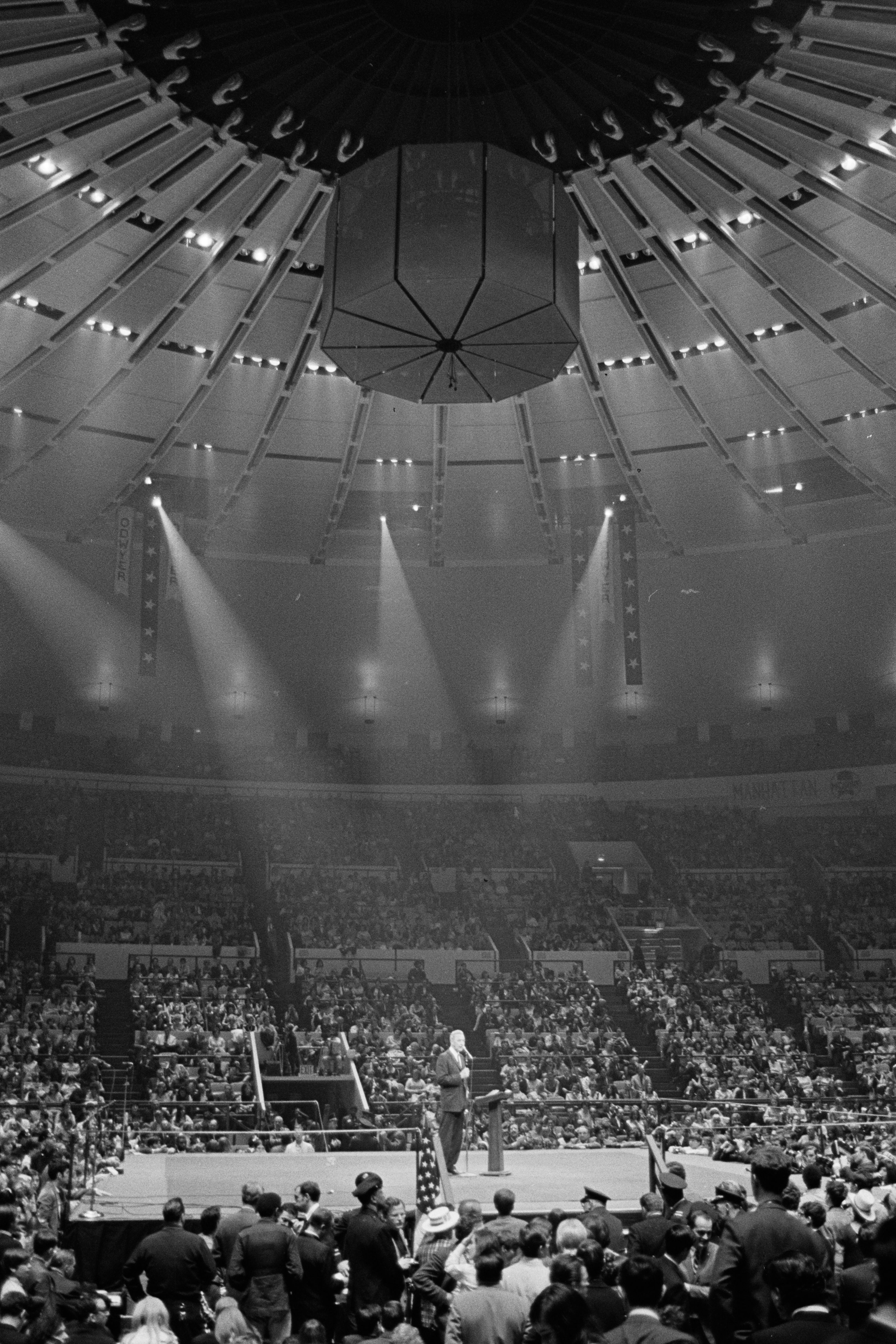
McCarthy speaks at a campaign rally at Madison Square Garden, May 19, 1968

On March 27, 1968, Kennedy announced his intention to run against McCarthy in the Indiana primary, although aides told him that a race in Indiana would be extremely tight and advised him against it. At the Indiana Statehouse, Kennedy told a cheering crowd that the state was important to his campaign: "If we can win in Indiana, we can win in every other state, and win when we go to the convention in August." The Indiana primary thus marked the first open entry of Kennedy into the field and pitted him against McCarthy and Governor Roger Branigin, a favorite son who had backed Johnson and now impliedly supported Humphrey.

Audio of Kennedy's Indianapolis speech

During his first campaign stop in Indiana, Kennedy delivered two of a trio notable speeches. First, on April 4, he spoke at Ball State University in Muncie. In this speech, Kennedy suggested the election would "determine the direction that the United States is going to move" and that the American people should "examine everything. Not take anything for granted." Kennedy expressed concerns about poverty and hunger, lawlessness and violence, jobs and economic development, and foreign policy. He emphasized that Americans had a "moral obligation" and should "make an honest effort to understand one another and move forward together." After leaving the stage at Ball State, Kennedy boarded a plane for Indianapolis. When he arrived, he was informed of the assassination of Martin Luther King Jr. Addressing a crowd gathered for a political rally on the black north side of the city, Kennedy gave a heartfelt impromptu speech to the crowd, calling for peace and compassion. The next day in Cleveland, he delivered prepared remarks entitled "On the Mindless Menace of Violence," elaborating the themes he had addressed in Indianapolis. After attending King's funeral in Atlanta, Kennedy resumed campaigning in Indiana on April 10.

Branigin campaigned in nearly all of the state's 92 counties, while McCarthy's campaign strategy concentrated on Indiana's rural areas and small towns. According to Kennedy's campaign advisor, John Bartlow Martin, the campaign gained momentum with Kennedy's visits to central and southern Indiana on April 22 and 23, which included a memorable whistle-stop railroad trip aboard the Wabash Cannonball. Martin urged the candidate to speak out against violence and rioting, emphasize his "law enforcement experience" as former U.S. Attorney General, and promote coordination between the government and private sector to solve domestic issues. Kennedy continued to speak out against the war and in support of the cessation of hostilities and reallocating war funds to domestic programs. To appeal to conservative voters, Kennedy "toned down his rhetoric" as well. McCarthy, meanwhile, contrasted his approach to conflict of "call[ing] upon everyone ... to be as fully responsible as [they] can be" against Humphrey's ("run[ning] things together indiscriminately") and Kennedy's (a "combination of separate interests ... or groups").

On May 7, Kennedy won with 42 percent of the vote; Branigan was second with 31 percent of the vote; and McCarthy, earning 27 percent, came in third. In response to the defeat, McCarthy remarked, "We've tested the enemy now, and we know his techniques ... we know his weaknesses."

Campaigning vigorously in the Nebraska primary, Kennedy hoped for a major win to give him momentum going into the crucial California primary in June. While McCarthy made only one visit to Nebraska, Kennedy made numerous appearances. Though Kennedy's advisors had been worried about his chances in Nebraska, given his lack of credibility on ranching and agriculture policy and the short amount of time to campaign in the state after the Indiana primary, Kennedy won on May 14 with 51.4 percent of the vote to McCarthy's 31 percent. Kennedy won 24 of the 25 counties that he visited ahead of the vote; of those, the sole county he lost by two votes was home to the University of Nebraska, where a plurality of students favored McCarthy. Kennedy declared that the results, where two anti-war candidates collectively earned over 80 percent of the vote, were "a smashing repudiation" of the Johnson-Humphrey administration.

A Newsweek delegate survey, taken after the Nebraska primary, showed 1,280 delegates (1,312 delegates needed to win the nomination) solid or leaning toward Humphrey, 714 leaning to Kennedy, and 280 favoring McCarthy.

In contrast to Nebraska, the Oregon primary posed several challenges to Kennedy's campaign. His campaign organization, run by U.S. Congresswoman Edith Green, was not strong and his platform emphasizing poverty, hunger, and minority issues did not resonate with Oregon voters. About Kennedy's calls for unity amongst Americans, Mills wrote that "As far as Oregonians were concerned, America had not fallen apart." The Kennedy campaign circulated material on McCarthy's record; McCarthy had voted against a minimum wage law and repeal of the poll tax in the Voting Rights Act of 1965. The McCarthy campaign responded with charges that Kennedy illegally taped Martin Luther King Jr. as United States Attorney General. Ten days ahead of the vote, Kennedy admitted his message did not appeal well to Oregonians: "This state is like one giant suburb. I appeal best to people who have problems." During a speech he gave in California, Kennedy also admitted, "I think that if I get beaten in any primary, I am not a very viable candidate," further raising the stakes in Oregon. Following that comment, Kennedy campaigned for sixteen hours a day; in the weeks before the election, his campaign canvased 50,000 homes.

On May 28, McCarthy won the Oregon primary with 44.7 percent; Kennedy received 38.8 percent of votes. After Kennedy's loss was confirmed, he sent a terse congratulatory message to McCarthy but asserted that he would remain in the race. According to Kennedy biographer Larry Tye, the defeat in Oregon proved to Kennedy that he needed to take risks and convinced voters that Kennedy was vulnerable to electoral defeat. Observers remarked that McCarthy was "back in the race as a real contender."

Meanwhile, in the Florida primary (also on May 28), a slate of Humphrey delegates led by favorite son George A. Smathers easily swept aside McCarthy, who managed only four delegates from two Miami congressional districts. Humphrey also picked up 83 of the 125 delegates from Pennsylvania, following an endorsement from Philadelphia Mayor James Tate, and collected delegates from non-primary party caucuses and state conventions. In April and May, Humphrey won the majority of delegates in Delaware, Alaska, Hawaii, Wyoming, Arizona, Maryland, Nevada, New Jersey, Missouri, Maine, and Vermont. The other candidates criticized this tactic, and accused Humphrey of organizing a "bossed convention" against the wishes of the people.

=== June 4: California, South Dakota, and New Jersey; Kennedy assassinated ===
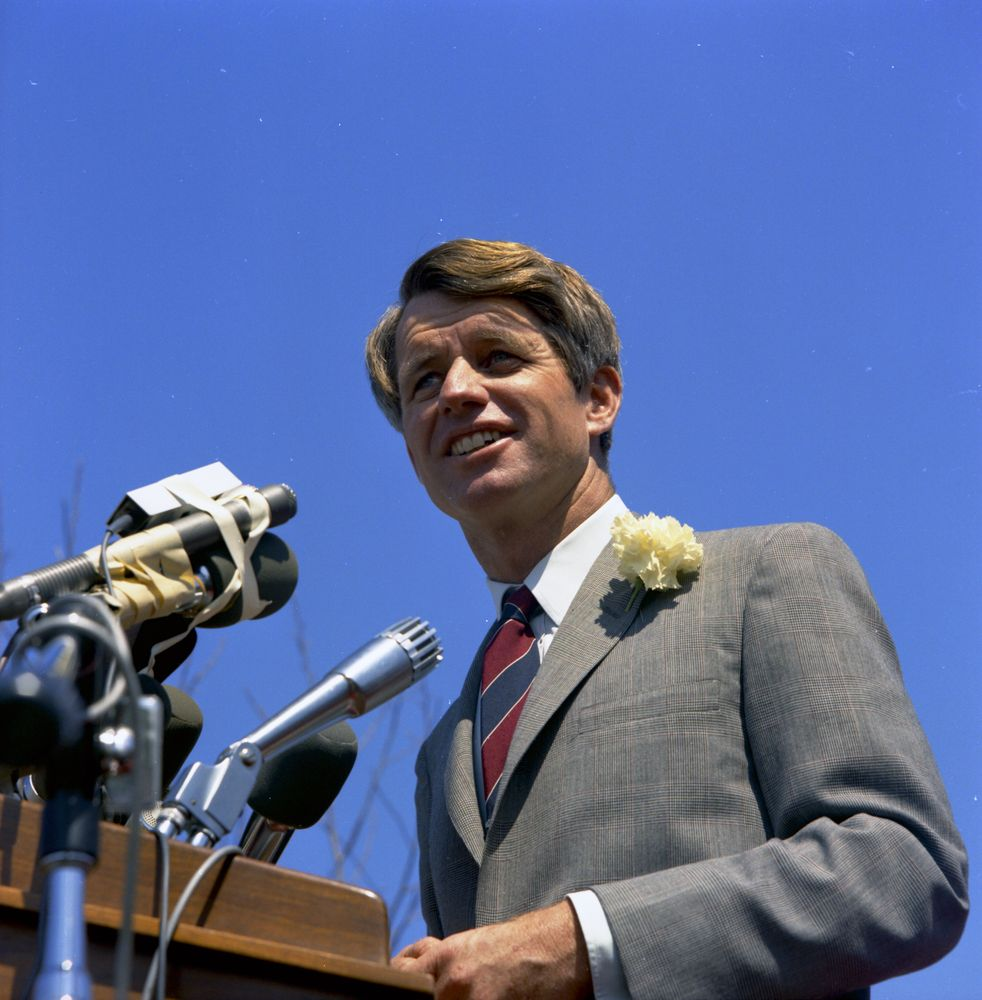
Kennedy campaigning in Los Angeles (photo courtesy of John F. Kennedy Presidential Library & Museum, Boston)

McCarthy and Kennedy vigorously campaigned throughout California in the beginning of June, with the latter announcing he would exit the race if he lost the state's primary. California's winner-take-all primary became crucial to both Kennedy and McCarthy's campaigns. McCarthy stumped the state's many colleges and universities, where he was treated as a hero for being the first presidential candidate to oppose the war. Kennedy campaigned in the ghettos and barrios of the state's larger cities, where he was mobbed by enthusiastic supporters. In the South Dakota primary, Kennedy also hoped to simultaneously pull off an upset victory over McCarthy and Humphrey, both from neighboring Minnesota (Humphrey was also a native of Wallace, South Dakota).

On June 1, Kennedy and McCarthy met in a televised debate on ABC's Issues and Answers, which observers generally considered a draw. "It was a conversation rather than a debate," said The New York Times, "and it demonstrated that the two rivals are in substantial agreement on every major issue." Though Kennedy considered the debate "indecisive and disappointing," subsequent polling showed that undecided voters favored his performance by a margin of two-to-one.

On June 3, Kennedy made a "final dash" through the state's major urban centers, San Francisco, Los Angeles, and San Diego; along with suburban Long Beach, in a single day. As his motorcade moved slowly through cheering crowds in San Francisco's Chinatown, gun shots appeared to ring out. However, it was just the sound of celebratory firecrackers. The campaign entourage and traveling press were all "scared to death," recalled Bill Eppridge, a Life magazine photographer in the car just ahead of the Kennedys.

On June 4, Kennedy privately expressed his hope to Theodore H. White that victories in the California and South Dakota primaries could persuade party insiders that he was more electable than Humphrey and thus win him crucial support from unpledged delegates. Kennedy won the California primary with 46 percent of the vote to McCarthy's 42 percent. Author Joseph Palermo referred to the victory as Kennedy's "greatest." Kennedy also won the South Dakota primary, winning approximately 50 percent of the vote.

McCarthy, who that same night defeated Kennedy in the New Jersey primary (with 36% of the write-in vote), made it clear that he would contest the upcoming New York primary on June 18 in Kennedy's adopted state.

==== Kennedy assassination ====
After giving his victory speech at the Ambassador Hotel in Los Angeles, Kennedy was assassinated in the kitchen service pantry in the early morning of June 5. Sirhan Sirhan, a 24-year-old Palestinian-born Jordanian, was arrested. Kennedy died 26 hours later at Good Samaritan Hospital.

At the moment of Kennedy's death, the delegate totals were estimated to be:

- Hubert Humphrey – 561
- Robert F. Kennedy – 393
- Eugene McCarthy – 258

Kennedy's death threw the Democratic Party into disarray. Shaken by the event, Humphrey took off two weeks from campaigning. He met with President Johnson, and the two talked about "everything" during a three-hour meeting. The assassination all but guaranteed Humphrey the nomination. He commented that he "was doing everything I could to win the nomination ... but God knows I didn't want it that way." A large number of Kennedy delegates switched to Humphrey, but he lost money from Republican donors concerned about a Kennedy nomination, and popular opinion polls shifted in favor of Senator McCarthy. In fact, Humphrey was booed before 50,000 people on June 19 at the Lincoln Memorial as he was introduced at a Solidarity March for civil rights. He tried to defend his record against the liberal detractors, but often encountered anti-war protesters and hostile crowds while campaigning. At the end of June, Republican Senator Mark Hatfield of Oregon assessed the race, arguing that Humphrey would be the party's nominee for president but criticized him for being too closely aligned with Johnson's policies.

== Schedule and results ==
=== Statewide results by winner ===
1968 Democratic primary results by county popular vote (Note: In Massachusetts, the results by county were not recorded, however it was recorded by congressional district.) McCarthy: McCarthy—30–40%; McCarthy—40–50%; McCarthy—50–60%; McCarthy—60–70%; McCarthy—70–80%; McCarthy—80–90%; Kennedy: Kennedy—30–40%; Kennedy—40–50%; Kennedy—50–60%; Kennedy—60–70%; Kennedy—70–80%; Kennedy—80–90%; Kennedy—90–100%; Johnson: Johnson—40–50%; Johnson—50–60%; Johnson—60–70%; Branigin: Branigin—30–40%; Branigin—40–50%; Branigin—50–60%; Humphrey: Humphrey—30–40%; Humphrey—40–50%; Humphrey—50–60%; Humphrey—60–70%; Humphrey—70–80%; Smathers: Smathers—30–40%; Smathers—40–50%; Smathers—50–60%; Smathers—60–70%; Young: Young—100%; Wallace: Wallace—40–50%; Nixon: Nixon—40–50%; Uncommitted: Uncommitted—30-40%; Uncommitted—40-50%; Uncommitted—100%; Tie: Tie—30-40%; Tie—40-50%; Tie—50%

Tablemaker's Note: (Note: This should not be taken as a finalized list of results. While a significant amount of research was done, there were a number of Delegates who were not bound by the instruction, or "Pledged" to a candidate, and to simplify the data these delegates were considered "Uncommitted". Many states also held primaries for the delegate positions, and these on occasion were where slates or candidates pledged to a certain candidate might be elected; however, as these elections allowed for a single person to vote for multiple candidates, as many as the number of positions being filled, it is difficult to determine how many people actually voted in these primaries. For this reason, while such results may be found, they are not included in the popular vote summaries at the bottom of the table.)

Date	Total pledged delegates	Contest and total popular vote	Delegates won and popular vote						
Date	Total pledged delegates	Contest and total popular vote	Hubert Humphrey	Eugene McCarthy	Robert Kennedy	Lyndon Johnson	Favorite Son(s)	Uncommitted	Other(s)
March 12	0 (of 24)	New Hampshire; Pres. Primary; 55,464	-	23,263 (41.94%)	606 WI (1.09%)	27,520 WI (49.62%)	-	-	4,075 (Note: Includes 2,532 Write-In votes for Richard Nixon at (4.57%), 506 Write-In votes for Paul C. Fisher at (0.91%), 249 votes for Governor Nelson Rockefeller at (0.45%), 201 Write-In votes for George Wallace at (0.36%), and 186 votes for John G. Crommelin at (0.34%).) (7.35%)
March 12	24 (of 24)	New Hampshire; Del. Primary ?	-	20 Del. 16,315	-	4 Del. 17,444	-	-	-
March 16	Robert F. Kennedy declares his candidacy								
March 16	22 (of 22)	Nevada; State Convention	-	-	-	-	-	22 Del.	-
March 28	28 (of 28)	South Carolina; State Convention	-	-	-	-	28 Del. (Note: Committed to Governor Robert McNair of South Carolina.) (Note: Initially uncommitted, the delegates met and decided to commit themselves to Governor McNair in April, following President Johnson's withdrawal from the race.)	-	-
March 30	38 (of 38)	Kansas; State Convention	-	-	-	-	-	38 Del.	-
March 31	Lyndon B. Johnson announces his withdrawal								
April 2	60 (of 60)	Wisconsin; Primary; 733,002	3,605 WI (0.49%)	52 Del. 412,160 (56.23%)	46,507 WI (6.35%)	8 Del. 253,696 (34.61%)	-	11,861 (1.62%)	5,173 WI (Note: Includes 4,031 Write-In votes for George Wallace at (0.55%).) (0.71%)
April 8	22 (of 22)	Alaska; State Convention	-	-	-	-	-	22 Del.	-
April 20	19 (of 19)	Arizona; State Convention	-	-	-	-	-	19 Del.	-
April 23	0 (of 130)	Pennsylvania; Pres. Primary; 599,966	51,998 WI (8.67%)	428,891 (71.49%)	65,430 WI (10.91%)	21,265 WI (3.54%)	-	-	32,382 (Note: Includes 24,147 Write-In votes for George Wallace at (4.03%), 3,434 Write-In votes for Richard Nixon at (0.57%), 1,897 Write-In votes for Governor Nelson Rockefeller at (0.32%), 327 Write-In votes for Governor Ronald Reagan at (0.06%), and 21 Write-In votes for Governor Raymond Shafer at (0.00%).) (5.40%)
April 23	130 (Note: Includes 49 delegate votes that were not apportioned this day.) (of 130)	Pennsylvania; Del. Primary	-	18 Del.	1.5 Del.	-	-	110.5 Del. (Note: Only 61.5 of the delegate votes were elected in the delegate primary; 49 of the delegate votes were amongst appointed delegates who had been chosen at another date. However, it is not currently known when this was.)	-
April 27	Hubert Humphrey declares his candidacy								
April 29	49 (of 49)	Maryland; State Convention	-	-	-	-	-	49 Del.	-
April 30	72 (of 72)	Massachusetts; Primary; 248,903	44,156 WI (17.74%)	72 Del. 122,697 (49.30%)	68,604 WI (27.56%)	6,890 WI (2.77%)	-	-	6,556 (Note: Includes 2,275 Write-In votes for Governor Nelson Rockefeller at (0.91%), 1,688 Write-In votes for George Wallace at (0.68%), and 575 Write-In votes for Richard Nixon at (0.23%).) (2.63%)
May 7	32 (of 32)	Alabama; Del. Primary	-	-	-	-	-	32 Del.	0 Del. (Note: More than half of the delegation was initially committed to supporting George Wallace; some backed down once Wallace made it clear he did not want to be nominated at the Democratic Convention, but there remained a significant cadre who wished to do so. Those remaining Wallace delegates however were later stripped of their right to sit as delegates given they refused to sign a pledge declaring their support for the Democratic nominee for President.)
May 7	63 (of 63)	Indiana; Primary; 776,513	-	209,695 (27.01%)	59 Del. (Note: This represents the minimum number of delegates Kennedy could have earned based on his performance; the delegates themselves and their apportionment were not to be decided until Mid-June, some time after Kennedy's assassination.); 328,118 (42.26%)	-	4 Del. (Note: Committed to Governor Roger Branigin of Indiana.); 238,700 (30.74%)	-	-
May 7	115 (of 115)	Ohio; Primary; 549,140	-	3 Del.	-	-	112 Del. (Note: Committed to Senator Stephen Young of Ohio.); 549,140 (100.00%)	-	-
May 7	23 (of 23)	Washington D.C. Primary; 92,114	34,559 (37.52%)	-	23 Del. 57,555 (62.48%)	-	-	-	-
May 11	22 (of 22)	Delaware; State Convention	16 Del.	-	6 Del.	-	-	-	-
May 11	9 (of 52)	Minnesota; 7th and 8th District Conventions	9 Del.	-	-	-	-	-	-
May 11	22 (of 22)	Wyoming; State Convention	-	-	-	-	-	22 Del.	-
May 12	26 (of 26)	Hawaii; State Convention	-	-	-	-	-	26 Del.	-
May 14	0 (of 30)	Nebraska; Pres. Primary; 162,611	12,087 WI (7.43%)	50,655 (31.15%)	84,102 (51.72%)	9,187 (5.65%)	-	-	6,580 WI (Note: Includes 2,731 Write-In votes for Richard Nixon at (1.68%), 1,905 Write-In votes for Governor Ronald Reagan at (1.17%), 1,298 Write-In votes for George Wallace at (0.80%), and 509 Write-In votes for Governor Nelson Rockefeller at (0.31%).) (4.04%)
May 14	28 (of 30)	Nebraska; Del. Primary	1 Del.	3 Del.	20 Del.	-	-	4 Del.	-
May 14	36 (of 38)	West Virginia; Del. Primary	-	-	-	-	-	36 Del. (Note: While some delegates mentioned their candidate of choice, by state law the delegates were uncommitted.)	-
May 16	43 (of 43)	Georgia; State Convention	-	-	-	-	-	43 Del.	-
May 18	27 (of 27)	Maine; State Convention	-	-	-	-	27 Del. (Note: Committed to Senator Edmund Muskie of Maine.)	-	-
May 25	6 (of 35)	Colorado; 1st District Convention	-	3 Del.	3 Del.	-	-	-	-
May 25	46 (of 46)	Iowa; State Convention	9.5 Del.	5 Del.	25 Del.	-	-	6.5 Del.	-
May 25	13.5 (of 52)	Minnesota; 3rd, 4th and 5th District Conventions	-	13.5 Del.	-	-	-	-	-
May 25	22 (of 22)	Vermont; State Convention; 996	10 Del. 399 (40.06%)	5 Del. 270 (27.11%)	7 Del. 327 (32.83%)	-	-	-	-
May 26	13.5 (of 52)	Minnesota; 1st, 2nd and 6th District Conventions	13.5 Del.	-	-	-	-	-	-
May 28	61 (of 63)	Florida; Primary; 512,357	-	4 Del. 147,216 (28.73%)	-	-	57 Del. (Note: Committed to Senator George Smathers of Florida.); 236,242 (46.11%)	128,899 (Note: Represents an Uncommitted slate led by State Senator Scott Kelly of Lakeland which said it would support either Robert Kennedy or George Wallace.) (25.16%)	-
May 28	35 (of 35)	Oregon; Primary; 373,070	12,421 WI (3.33%)	35 Del. 163,990 (43.96%)	141,631 (37.96%)	45,174 (12.11%)	-	-	9,854 WI (Note: Includes 3,082 Write-In votes for Governor Ronald Reagan at (0.83%), 2,974 Write-In votes for Richard Nixon at (0.80%), 2,841 Write-In votes for Governor Nelson Rockefeller at (0.76%), and 957 Write-In votes for George Wallace at (0.26%).) (2.64%)
May 28	27 (of 27)	Rhode Island; State Committee	-	-	-	-	-	27 Del.	-
June 1	60 (of 60)	Missouri; State Convention	-	-	-	-	-	60 Del.	-
June 2	96 (of 96)	Michigan; State Convention	-	-	-	-	-	96 Del.	-
June 4	172 (of 174)	California; Primary; 3,181,753	-	1,329,301 (41.78%)	172 Del. 1,472,166 (46.27%)	-	-	380,286 (Note: Votes for an Uncommitted slate headed by State Attorney General Thomas Lynch.) (11.95%)	-
June 4	0 (of 82)	New Jersey; Pres. Primary; 27,446	5,578 WI (20.32%)	9,906 WI (36.09%)	8,603 WI (31.35%)	380 WI (1.39%)	-	-	2,979 (Note: Includes 1,399 Write-In votes for George Wallace at (5.10%), 1,364 Write-In votes for Richard Nixon at (4.97%), 176 Write-In votes for Governor Nelson Rockefeller at (0.64%), and 40 Write-In votes for Governor Ronald Reagan at (0.15%).) (10.85%)
June 4	80 (of 82)	New Jersey; Del. Primary	-	20 Del.	-	-	60 Del. (Note: Committed to Governor Richard Hughes of New Jersey.)	-	-
June 4	24 (of 24)	South Dakota; Primary; 64,287	-	13,145 (20.45%)	24 Del. 31,826 (49.51%)	19,316 (30.05%)	-	-	-
June 6	Kennedy is assassinated								
June 6	59 (of 59)	North Carolina; State Convention	-	-	-	-	59 Del. (Note: Committed to Governor Dan Moore of North Carolina.)	-	-
June 11	0 (of 118)	Illinois; Pres. Primary; 12,038	2,059 WI (17.10%)	4,646 WI (38.59%)	-	162 WI (1.35%)	-	-	5,171 (Note: Includes 4,052 Write-In votes for Senator Edward Kennedy at (33.66%), and 768 Write-In votes for George Wallace at (6.38%).) (42.96%)
June 11	48 (of 118)	Illinois; Del. Primary	-	2 Del.	-	-	-	46 Del.	-
June 11	104 (of 104)	Texas; State Convention	-	-	-	-	104 Del. (Note: Committed to Governor John Connally of Texas.)	-	-
June 12	5 (of 5)	Panama Canal Zone; Territorial Convention	-	-	-	-	-	5 Del.	-
June 14	36 (of 36)	Louisiana; State Convention	-	-	-	-	36 Del. (Note: Committed to Governor John McKeithen of Louisiana.)	-	-
June 15	25 (of 25)	Idaho; State Convention	-	-	-	-	-	25 Del.	-
June 15	26 (of 26)	Montana; State Convention	24 Del.	2 Del.	-	-	-	-	-
June 17	6 (of 35)	Colorado; 2nd District Convention	-	5 Del.	-	-	-	1 Del. (Note: This delegate was formally for Senator Robert Kennedy before his assassination.)	-
June 18	123 (of 190)	New York; Del. Primary	19 Del.	62 Del.	-	-	-	42 Del. (Note: 30 of these delegates were committed to Senator Robert Kennedy before his assassination.)	-
June 22	44 (of 44)	Connecticut; State Convention	-	0 Del. (Note: 9 delegates had initially been apportioned to McCarthy, but after the McCarthyites walked out because of the Conventions refusal to name a 10th McCarthy delegates, all 9 slots were filled with Uncommitted delegates.)	-	-	-	44 Del.	-
June 22	13.5 (of 52)	Minnesota; State Convention	14 Del.	-	-	-	-	-	-
June 27	33 (of 33)	Arkansas; State Committee	-	-	-	-	-	33 Del.	-
June 28	68 (of 118)	Illinois; State Convention	-	-	-	-	-	68 Del.	-
June 28	65 (of 190)	New York; State Committee	-	15.5 Del.	-	-	-	49.5 Del.	-
June 28	51 (of 51)	Tennessee; State Convention	-	-	-	-	51 Del. (Note: Committed to Governor Buford Ellington of Tennessee.)	-	-
June 29	26 (of 26)	New Mexico; State Convention	15 Del.	11 Del.	-	-	-	-	-
June 29	25 (of 25)	North Dakota; State Convention	17 Del.	7 Del.	-	-	-	1 Del.	-
June 29	41 (of 41)	Oklahoma; State Convention	37 Del.	2.7 Del.	-	-	-	1.3 Del.	-
July 2	24 (of 24)	Mississippi; State Convention	-	-	-	-	-	24 Del. (Note: "Regulars" and "Loyalists" named opposing delegations to the National Convention, with the Loyalists being seated. Neither delegation was committed.)	-
July 6	6 (of 35)	Colorado; 3rd District Convention	3 Del.	2 Del.	-	-	-	1 Del. (Note: This delegate was formally for Senator Robert Kennedy before his assassination.)	-
July 13	6 (of 35)	Colorado; State Convention	-	2 Del.	-	-	-	4 Del. (Note: These delegates were formally for Senator Robert Kennedy before his assassination.)	-
July 13	6 (of 35)	Colorado; 4th District Convention	6 Del.	-	-	-	-	-	-
July 13	47 (of 47)	Washington; State Convention	32.5 Del.	9.5 Del.	-	-	-	5 Del.	-
July 27	46 (of 46)	Kentucky; State Convention	41 Del.	5 Del.	-	-	-	-	-
July 27	26 (of 26)	Utah; State Convention	20 Del.	-	-	-	-	6 Del. (Note: Four of the delegates were formally supporters of Senator Robert Kennedy before his assassination.)	-
July 27	63 (of 63)	Virginia; State Convention	-	-	-	-	63 Del. (Note: Committed to Governor Mills Godwin of Virginia.)	-	-
Total; 2,622 pledged delegates 7,356,838 votes			258 166,463 (2.26%)	379.2 2,915,565 (39.63%)	340.5 2,273,322 (30.90%)	12 383,590 (5.21%)	601 1,024,082 (13.92%)	968.8 521,046 (7.08%)	0 72,770 (0.99%)
Suspected Delegate Count; June 5, 1968			561.5 (21.41%)	255 (9.73%)	393.5 (15.01%)	-	310 (11.82%)	99 (3.78%)	2 (Note: Supporting George Wallace of Alabama.) (0.08%)
Suspected Delegate Count; August 27, 1968			1,159.5 (44.22%)	487.5 (18.59%)	-	-	179.5 (6.85%)	727 (27.73%)	51.5 (Note: Supporting Senator George McGovern of South Dakota.) (1.96%)

Total popular vote:

- Eugene McCarthy – 2,914,933 (38.73%)
- Robert F. Kennedy – 2,305,148 (30.63%)
- Lyndon B. Johnson – 383,590 (5.10%)
- Hubert Humphrey – 166,463 (2.21%)
- Unpledged – 161,143 (2.14%)

Johnson/Humphrey surrogates:

- Stephen M. Young – 549,140 (7.30%)
- Thomas C. Lynch – 380,286 (5.05%)
- Roger D. Branigin – 238,700 (3.17%)
- George Smathers – 236,242 (3.14%)
- Scott Kelly – 128,899 (1.71%)

Minor candidates and write-ins:

- George Wallace – 34,489 (0.46%)
- Richard Nixon – 13,610 (0.18%)
- Ronald Reagan – 5,309 (0.07%)
- Ted Kennedy – 4,052 (0.05%)
- Paul C. Fisher – 506 (0.01%)
- John G. Crommelin – 186 (0.00%)

== Democratic Convention and antiwar protests ==
When the 1968 Democratic National Convention opened in Chicago, thousands of young antiwar activists from around the nation gathered in the city to protest the Vietnam War. In a clash covered on live television, Americans were shocked to see Chicago Police officers brutally beating antiwar protesters. While the protesters chanted "the whole world is watching," the police used clubs and tear gas to beat back the protesters, leaving many of them bloody and dazed. The tear gas even wafted into numerous hotel suites. In one of them, Humphrey was watching the proceedings on television. Meanwhile, the convention itself was marred by the strong-armed tactics of Chicago Mayor Richard J. Daley, who was seen on television angrily cursing Connecticut Senator Abraham Ribicoff, who had made a speech at the convention denouncing the excesses of the Chicago police in the riots.

In the end, the nomination itself was anticlimactic, with Humphrey handily beating McCarthy and McGovern on the first ballot. The convention then chose Senator Edmund Muskie of Maine as Humphrey's running mate. However, the tragedy of the antiwar riots crippled the Humphrey campaign from the start, and it never fully recovered. (White, pp. 377–378;)

The Final Ballot
Presidential tally		Vice Presidential tally	
Hubert Humphrey	1759.25	Edmund S. Muskie	1942.5
Eugene McCarthy	601	Not Voting	604.25
George S. McGovern	146.5	Julian Bond	48.5
Channing Phillips	67.5	David Hoeh	4
Daniel K. Moore	17.5	Edward M. Kennedy	3.5
Edward M. Kennedy	12.75	Eugene McCarthy	3.0
Paul E. "Bear" Bryant	1.5	Others	16.25
James H. Gray	0.5		
George Wallace	0.5		

Source: Keating Holland, "All the Votes... Really," CNN

=== Endorsements ===
Hubert Humphrey

Presidents

- President Lyndon B. Johnson of Texas
- Former President Harry S. Truman of Missouri

U.S. Senators

- Senator Walter F. Mondale of Minnesota

Municipal Officials

- Mayor Richard J. Daley of Chicago

Individuals

- Entertainer Frank Sinatra

Robert F. Kennedy

U.S. Senators

- Senator Ralph Yarborough of Texas
- Senator Abraham Ribicoff of Connecticut
- Senator George McGovern of South Dakota
- Senator Ted Kennedy of Massachusetts, the candidate's brother
- Senator Vance Hartke of Indiana
- Former Senator Pierre Salinger of California

House of Representatives

- John V. Tunney of California

Governors

- Governor Harold E. Hughes of Iowa

State Officials

- California Speaker of the Assembly Jesse Unruh

Individuals

- Cesar Chavez, President of the United Farm Workers
- Labor Leader Dolores Huerta
- Anti-war Activist Tom Hayden
- Writer Norman Mailer
- Actress Shirley MacLaine
- Actress Angie Dickinson
- Actress Stefanie Powers
- Actor Peter Lawford, the candidate's former brother-in-law
- Actor Bill Cosby
- Musician Sammy Davis Jr.
- Musician Andy Williams
- Musician and actress Claudine Longet
- Musicians Sonny & Cher
- Musicians The Byrds
- Musician Bobby Darin
- Artist Andy Warhol
- Astronaut John Glenn
- NFL football player Lamar Lundy
- NFL football player Rosey Grier
- NFL football player Deacon Jones
- Film and television director John Frankenheimer
- Documentary film director Charles Guggenheim
- Actor Warren Beatty
- Actor Tony Curtis
- Actor Jack Lemmon
- Actor Gregory Peck
- Actor Robert Vaughn

Eugene McCarthy

House of Representatives

- Representative Don Edwards of California

Individuals

- Actor Paul Newman
- Actor Gene Wilder
- Musicians Simon & Garfunkel
- Singer Barbra Streisand
- Actor Walter Matthau
- Actor Dustin Hoffman
- Baritone Singer Gilbert Price
- Film Director Mike Nichols
- Screenwriter Neil Simon
- Composer Leonard Bernstein
- Actress Joanne Woodward
- Actress Phyllis Newman
- Tom Carper, future U.S. Senator from Delaware

George McGovern (during convention)

Governors

- Governor Harold E. Hughes of Iowa

U.S. Senators

- Senator Abraham Ribicoff of Connecticut
- Senator Joseph S. Clark of Pennsylvania

== See also ==
- 1968 Republican Party presidential primaries
