= Black excellence =

High achievement or ability in a black person

Black excellence is a term referring to high achievement, success, or ability demonstrated by a Black person or by Black people collectively. It is most commonly used to celebrate and highlight accomplishments, often through the hashtag #BlackExcellence, but the concept also carries both positive and negative connotations and has been the subject of academic and cultural criticism.

== Etymology and origins ==
The term does not have a single documented origin. According to Dictionary.com, it has been in use since at least the 1970s, emerging alongside similarly structured phrases such as Black Power that grew out of the civil rights movement of the 1960s, though the underlying idea can be traced to the writings of earlier Black thinkers. Use of the term increased significantly in the 2000s, in part due to its adoption as a social media hashtag.

== Definition and usage ==
Merriam-Webster defines Black excellence as extreme excellence demonstrated by Black people despite racist systems that make achievement and recognition more difficult, and also as the determined pursuit of such excellence as a means of resisting and overcoming racism. The term is frequently associated with celebrations of Black achievement in entertainment, sport, academia, and the arts. The BET Awards, first held in 2001, have been widely described as a celebration of Black excellence in popular culture. Actor and activist Jesse Williams invoked these themes in his speech accepting the BET Humanitarian Award in June 2016, in which he addressed systemic racism and the commercialization of Black culture.

== Criticism ==
The concept has been critiqued for the pressure and expectations it can place on Black individuals. In a 2021 critical race theory analysis published in The Vermont Connection, Janelle Raymundo examined how the framework of Black excellence can foster perfectionism among Black students and contribute to an impossible standard in which anything short of exceptional achievement is treated as failure. Commentators have similarly argued that the term has shifted from an aspiration into an expectation, describing the resulting pressure as exhausting and detrimental to mental health. Critics have also noted that Black excellence is sometimes linked to respectability politics, in which marginalized individuals adopt the norms of dominant social groups to gain acceptance. The activist Clarissa Brooks, in an interview with Black Women Radicals, argued that narratives of Black excellence at historically black colleges and universities have often excluded poor, working-class, queer, transgender, non-binary, and disabled members of the Black community. A 2024 study of Black working-class young people in an English secondary school explored how students negotiated ideals of Black excellence, describing the difficulty of balancing the pursuit of opportunity with the expectation of remaining "respectable" in predominantly white educational settings.

== See also ==
- Black capitalism
- Respectability politics
- Talented Tenth
