= Scott Kelly (politician) =

American politician (1927–2005)

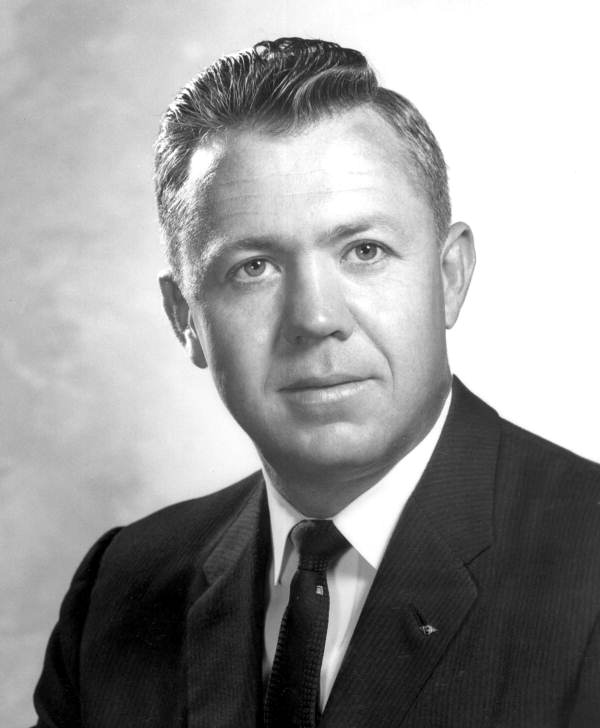
- Kelly in 1963

Member of the Florida Senate from the 7th district
- In office 1957–1963

Personal details
- Born: September 20, 1927 Madison, Florida, U.S.
- Died: April 3, 2005 (aged 77) Lakeland, Florida, U.S.
- Party: Democratic

Sherrod Scott Kelly (September 20, 1927 – April 3, 2005) was an American politician. A Democrat, he served in the Florida Senate from 1957 to 1963, representing the seventh district.

Born in Madison, Florida, on September 20, 1927, Kelly was raised in Gadsden County and graduated from what became Gadsden County High School. Kelly played for the Florida Gators football team, before leaving the University of Florida to join the military. Kelly moved from Quincy to Lakeland in 1949, and four years later, was elected to the city commission. Kelly won two terms as mayor of Lakeland before unseating Republican state senator Harry King in 1956. Kelly left the state senate in 1963, and began campaigning for the Democratic gubernatorial nomination, which he lost to Haydon Burns. In 1966, Kelly contested the nomination again, and finished third. Kelly ran in the Florida primary of the 1968 Democratic Party presidential primaries, placing third behind Senator George Smathers, who was running as a stand-in candidate for Vice President Hubert Humphrey, and Senator Eugene McCarthy. Kelly represented the unpledged delegates who did not want to be pledged to a candidate at the 1968 Democratic National Convention.

He died at home in Lakeland of cancer on April 3, 2005, aged 77.
