= Honeywell Project =

The Honeywell Project was a peace group based in Minneapolis, Minnesota, United States that existed from the late 1960s until around 1990. During its existence, the organization waged a campaign to convince the board and executives of the Honeywell Corporation to convert their weapons manufacturing business to peaceful production.

== Purpose and beginning ==
Marv Davidov, founder of the organization, says that in 1968, Staughton Lynd wrote an article calling for anti-war activists to oppose the Vietnam war by taking the struggle to the corporations that were profiting from it. In response to this Davidov and other activists in Minnesota began researching the local corporations and their ties to the military. At the time, the Honeywell corporation was Minnesota's largest military contractor. Over the two decades, Honeywell corporation's military contracts included the production of conventional weapons such as cluster bombs and guidance systems for both nuclear weapons and military aircraft. The group formed to challenge Honeywell's participation in the Vietnam war specifically, but also to oppose the corporation's military contracts in general.

== Activities ==
In its early days the Project sponsored cultural and educational events coupled with large demonstrations outside of Honeywell's corporate headquarters in south Minneapolis. In the 1980s the group turned to large actions of nonviolent civil disobedience as its primary tactic. Additionally, the organization leafleted workers at Honeywell's various plants and sponsored study groups and trainings in nonviolence. As the civil disobedience actions grew larger, the Project began organizing people into affinity groups.

== Membership ==
The Honeywell Project had no formal membership, but the base of the organization was a coalition of secular and religious pacifists, socialists, anarchists, and activists from the anti-war, labor, solidarity movements. Participants came from a wide variety of occupations and ages and was open to anyone. Like many similar organizations of the time, participants were mostly white, though a few native Americans, African-Americans, and Hispanics were involved.

== Slogans or demands ==
Over the years the organization focused on four main demands, the exact wording of which varied from time to time. Roughly speaking, these demands were:

- Peace conversion without loss of jobs
- No components for nuclear weapons
- No cluster bombs or other conventional weapons.
- Worker and community control over Honeywell and the nation's corporation.

Most of the banners and signs appearing at the organization's events referred to one of these slogans. The first three of these demands seems to have had the most support within the organization and thus received the highest attention. However, when leafleting the Honeywell plants, the labor activists in the organization also focused on the fourth.

== Organizational history ==
=== Vietnam era and COINTELPRO, 1968–1970s ===
The project's activities came in three phases with a dormant period in the mid-1970s. Between 1968 and 1972 the group focused on the Vietnam War. With the end of the war, the Project appeared to die off. When it was revealed that the organization had been infiltrated by FBI agents during its COINTELPRO program the group revived and in conjunction with the American Civil Liberties Union filed a lawsuit against the FBI. This led to a low level of activity that lasted through the mid-1980s when the suit was settled out of court.

=== Civil disobedience campaign, 1982–1990 ===
In 1982 a burgeoning anti-nuclear and the Plowshares Eight inspired the group to once again take action in the streets. Davidov and a few members of the Catholic Worker Movement began to meet and plan a nonviolent civil disobedience action for November of that year. The action received a small amount of press. Thirty-six participants were arrested for blocking the entrances of the corporate headquarters. From this action came a trial and Honeywell Project organizers recruited activists for another, larger action in the spring of 1983 in conjunction with Honeywell's annual shareholders meeting.

This set a pattern that would be repeated over the next few years. There would be two large civil disobedience actions per year, one in the spring and one in the fall. Each action would be preceded by a large rally with an educational speaker and musicians, designed to reach out to the public and educate the activists. Notable speakers at these rallies included Daniel Berrigan, Phillip Berrigan, Daniel Ellsberg, and Noam Chomsky. The cultural component of these events included musicians and authors such as Utah Phillips, Meridel Le Sueur, Dean Reed and Robert Bly.

The following day the group would hold a mass action at Honeywell's corporate headquarters with places for people risking arrest and supporters. The largest of these demonstrations took place on October 24, 1983, when thousands of protesters blockaded the entrances to Honeywell's corporate offices for over twelve hours, resulting in the arrests of 577 people.

In 1983 media reports of the demonstrations became much more prominent with the arrest of Erica Bouza, wife of Minneapolis's Chief of Police, Tony Bouza.

Between the large actions, several smaller actions took place. Some were sponsored directly by the Honeywell Project and other indirectly by affinity groups affiliated with the organization. Over the seven-year campaign several thousand people were arrested, resulting in hundreds of court trials. Those convicted usually received light sentences of two to four days in jail, moderate fines, or mandatory community service. A few cases resulted in acquittals. At one point over a thousand court trials were scheduled in Hennepin County as a result of these demonstrations.

=== Campaign against testing sites, 1987–1988 ===
In the late 1980s Honeywell's testing site in Arden Hills, Minnesota was showing signs of age and they began looking for an alternative site to test their weapons. Two attempts to find a suitable site elsewhere in Minnesota met organized opposition from local residents, some of whom had participated in the demonstrations in Minneapolis.

In 1987 Honeywell purchased land in the Black Hills of South Dakota with a plan of creating their testing site there. Honeywell Project members worked in Minneapolis to support a group of white ranchers and Native Americans that called themselves the "Cowboy and Indian Alliance" or "CIA". The Honeywell Project reasoned that if Honeywell could not find a place to reliably test its weapons it would be unable to manufacture weapons of sufficient quality to sell to the military. In the end Honeywell was unable to install its testing site anywhere and Honeywell converted the land into a sanctuary for wild horses.

The main focus of the Honeywell Project at this time was still on its large civil disobedience oriented events and the main force behind the opposition to all three test site proposals came from local activists.

== Decline ==
As the demonstrations grew in their regularity and predictability, their newsworthiness changed. Articles still appeared in the local paper, but as often as not they began to appear in the society pages, rather than in the news section. The Honeywell corporation adapted to the regularity of the events taking moves to minimize the disruptions they caused. Factional and personality splits within the organization led to a number of participants leaving.

In the end many of the activists that made up the core of the Honeywell Project moved on to other struggles or changed their tactics. Some affinity groups continued to meet but related less to the Project as an organization. By 1990 the Project had ceased to formally meet.

== End results ==
In September 1990, Honeywell spun off most of its military contracts business and formed a new company Alliant Techsystems. At the time, corporate spokespeople dismissed the notion that the Honeywell Project's activities had any part in their decision to do this. Honeywell Project activists disagreed.

Some of the activists that once worked on the campaign against Honeywell, and others, became involved in AlliantACTION, a similar group that conducted weekly vigils outside of Alliant Techsystems' headquarters in Hopkins, Edina, and Eden Prairie, Minnesota, from 1996 to 2011. AlliantACTION conducted its final weekly vigil on October 5, 2011, after Alliant Techsystems moved its corporate headquarters to Arlington, Virginia.

In January, 2012, Honeywell Project founder Marv Davidov died.
