= Milton Gwirtzman =

American lawyer

Milton Saul Gwirtzman (March 17, 1933 in Rochester, New York – July 23, 2011 in Bethesda, Maryland) was an American author, speech writer, lobbyist, and lawyer within international law. He was educated at Harvard University and Yale Law School. He is best remembered as a key advisor and speech writer for the Kennedy family; having close associations with the lives and careers of John F. Kennedy, Robert F. Kennedy and Ted Kennedy.
