= Harry Eubank King =

Florida politician (1902–1981)

Harry Eubank King (1902–1981) was a lawyer and state legislator in Florida. He served in the Florida Senate from 1941 to 1956. He was a Democrat. The Florida Archives have photographs of him. He represented Polk County, the 7th District.

He served as City Attorney for Winter Haven.
