= Robert S. Browne =

Robert Span Browne
- Born: 1924
- Died: 2004 (aged 79–80)
- Occupation: Economist
- Known for: advocacy of Black development

Robert Span Browne (born 1924 – August 5, 2004) was an economist who founded African-American self-help programs.

== Education ==
Browne graduated from the University of Chicago with an honors degree in economics. He served in the Army Air Forces. In 1947, he was among the first black Americans to receive an M.B.A. in finance from the University of Chicago. He completed postgraduate studies at the London School of Economics and, later, completed doctoral work at the City University of New York.

== Career ==
In 1955, Browne joined the Agency for International Development. There he was a program officer in Cambodia until 1958 and was reassigned to South Vietnam, where he was stationed until 1961.

After 1961, he was project director for the Stokes-Phelps Fund and, until 1971, taught economics at Fairleigh Dickinson University in Teaneck.

Browne founded the 21st-Century Foundation, which was formed in 1971. he was active in the economic development work in Cambodia and Vietnam. In 1969, he founded the Black Economic Research Center in Harlem and directed it until 1980.

In 1971, he set up an Emergency Land Fund to prevent the shrinking of black land ownership in the southern United States. From 1980 to 1982, he was the first U.S. executive director of the African Development Bank in Abidjan, Ivory Coast.

He then was a senior research fellow at Howard University and, until 1991, staff director of a House subcommittee dealing with issues involving the World Bank, the International Monetary Fund, and Third World debt.

== Legacy ==
Browne's papers are stored at the Swarthmore College Peace Collection.

== Personal life ==
Browne was born in Chicago and lived in Teaneck, New Jersey. Browne married Huoi Nguyen Browne, whom he met while working in Cambodia. At his death, he had two daughters and two sons.
