= Joseph Palermo =

American historian (born 1959)

- Born: January 27, 1959 (age 67)
- Occupations: Professor of History and at Sacramento State University
- Spouse: Jannette Dayton Palermo
- Writing career
- Period: 1998-present
- Subjects: United States History; The 1960s Robert F. Kennedy
- Website: josephapalermo.com

Joseph A. Palermo (born January 27, 1959) is a full (has been so since 2013) professor of history at Sacramento State University, an author and a commentator.

He received his undergraduate degree in sociology and anthropology (double major) from UC Santa Cruz in 1984, a master's degree in history from San Jose State University in 1986 and a master's and doctorate in American history (minor fields: anthropology and modern Latin America) from Cornell University in 1998. The Politics of Race and War: Robert F. Kennedy and the Democratic Party, 1965-1968 was the title of his dissertation.

For four years after receiving his doctorate, Palermo taught at Cornell and Colgate University. Since 2002, he teaches classes on the 1960s, the Vietnam War, foreign relations, historiography, and the history and politics of the 20th century at Sacramento State University in Sacramento, California.

His expertise includes Robert F. Kennedy, the 1960s, political history, presidential politics and war powers, social movements of the 20th century, the 1980s, and the history of American foreign policy.

Palermo makes frequent contributions to the Huffington Post, the online social justice magazine LA Progressive and Common Dreams. His articles have been primarily liberal in outlook and critical of former U.S. President George W. Bush.

== Publications ==
- “Robert Francis Kennedy,” in Scribner's the Dictionary of American History, Supplement: America in the World, 1776 to the Present, (Farmington Hills, Michigan: Greenhaven Press, Cengage Learning, 2015).
- “Robert F. Kennedy,” in A Companion to John F. Kennedy, edited by Marc Selverstone, Director of the Miller Center, University of Virginia, (Malden, Massachusetts: Wiley-Blackwell, 2014).
- "The Eighties", American Decades Series, (Upper Saddle River, New Jersey: Pearson Education, 2013). [Series Editor: Professor Terry Anderson].
- “The Wall Street Bailouts Were Socialism for the Wealthy,” in Is Socialism Harmful? edited by Ronald D. Lankford, Jr., (Farmington Hills, Michigan: Greenhaven Press, Gale-Cengage Learning, 2011).
- "Robert F. Kennedy and the Death of American Idealism", The Library of American Biography, (Upper Saddle River, New Jersey: Pearson Education, 2008). [Series Editor: Professor Mark C. Carnes]
- “Politics, Public Opinion, and Popular Culture,” in Watergate and the Resignation of Richard Nixon, edited by Harry P. Jeffrey and Thomas Maxwell-Long, (Congressional Quarterly Press, 2004)
- “Father Daniel Berrigan: The FBI's Most Wanted Peace Activist,” in The Human Tradition in America Since 1945, edited by David L. Anderson, (Scholarly Resources, 2003)
- "In His Own Right: The Political Odyssey of Senator Robert F. Kennedy", (Columbia University Press, 2001)
