= Robert Mayo =

Robert or Bob Mayo may refer to:

- Robert Murphy Mayo (1836–1896), U.S. Representative from Virginia
- Robert P. Mayo (1916–2003), director of the United States Office of Management and Budget in 1969–70
- Bob Mayo (1951–2004), American musician
