= Charles Zwick =

American civil servant

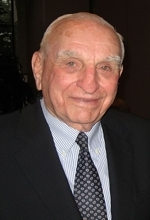

17th Director of the Bureau of the Budget
- In office January 29, 1968 – January 21, 1969
- President: Lyndon B. Johnson
- Preceded by: Charles Schultze
- Succeeded by: Bob Mayo

Personal details
- Born: Charles John Zwick; July 17, 1926 Plantsville, Connecticut, U.S.
- Died: April 20, 2018 (aged 91) Coral Gables, Florida
- Party: Democratic
- Education: University of Connecticut, Storrs (BA, MA); Harvard University (PhD)

Charles John Zwick (July 17, 1926 – April 20, 2018) was an American civil servant who served as director of the United States' Office of Management and Budget from January 29, 1968, until January 21, 1969, under the administration of Lyndon B. Johnson.

Zwick was born in Plantsville, Connecticut and attended a rural one-room school. He served in the military from 1946 to 1948. Zwick attended the University of Connecticut. A college roommate of the late Bernard P. Dzielinski (of Terryville, CT), Zwick earned a bachelor's degree in economics in 1950 and a master's degree in agricultural economics in 1951. He earned a doctorate in economics from Harvard University in 1954 and served for two years as a professor at the institution. He worked for the RAND Corporation from 1956 through 1965, where he researched American military and economic assistance programs for Southeast Asian nations.

Zwick joined the Bureau of the Budget in 1965, serving as its deputy director until 1968. During his tenure, Zwick became the last director to submit to Congress a proposal for a balanced budget. He left government at the end of the Johnson administration. Zwick then took a position as CEO of Southeast Banking Corporation, and he served in this capacity for 22 years until his resignation in 1991 due to loses pertaining to real estate investments. Zwick was a member of the Non-Group, a civically influential group of Miami-Dade business elites.

Zwick died of cancer in Coral Gables, Florida on April 20, 2018.

Political offices
Preceded by Charles Schultze	Director of the Bureau of the Budget; 1969–1970	Succeeded by Bob Mayo
