= Robert P. Mayo =

Bob Mayo

President of the Federal Reserve Bank of Chicago
- In office July 29, 1970 – April 1, 1981
- Preceded by: Charles Scanlon
- Succeeded by: Silas Keehn

18th Director of the Bureau of the Budget
- In office January 22, 1969 – June 30, 1970
- President: Richard Nixon
- Preceded by: Charles Zwick
- Succeeded by: George Shultz (Office of Management and Budget)

Personal details
- Born: March 15, 1916 Seattle, Washington, U.S.
- Died: January 25, 2003 (aged 86) Elgin, Illinois, U.S.
- Party: Republican
- Education: University of Washington, Seattle (BA, MA)

Robert Porter Mayo (March 15, 1916 – January 25, 2003) was a director of the United States' Office of Management and Budget from January 22, 1969, until June 30, 1970. He was the last person to lead this agency under its former name of the Bureau of the Budget.

Mayo was born in Seattle, Washington, the only child of Carl Asa and Edna Alberta (Nelson) Mayo. He attained a bachelor's degree in business from the University of Washington in 1937 and earned a master's degree in economics from the school in 1938. He found employment with the Washington State Tax Commission as an auditor; he was soon promoted to become the organization's director of research.

In 1941, Mayo joined the staff of the Department of Treasury. He began his work as an economic analyst. He eventually rose to the rank of assistant to the Secretary of Treasury for debt management. He left government in 1961 to serve as vice president of Continental Illinois Bank with former colleague David M. Kennedy, who worked with him in the Department of Treasury. Mayo supervised the public affairs and trust investment operations of the bank. He also was a leader in efforts to develop black capitalism in Chicago.

Known for his detail orientation and conservative views on spending from his time in Washington, Mayo was chosen in 1969 by incoming President Richard Nixon to develop his initial policy budgets; Mayo was considered to be a proponent of Nixon's black capitalism programs, which were designed to boost the economic fortunes of African Americans through loans and investment in black-owned business. Mayo rubbed Nixon the wrong way and also bored the president during long meetings. Nixon soon took to avoiding meetings with him altogether until Mayo demanded a meeting, which the president granted in March 1970. At the meeting, Mayo made the mistake of complaining that John Ehrlichman, who was Nixon's chief domestic adviser, was ostensibly intruding on his turf and threatened to resign if his relations with the president didn't improve, leading Nixon to conclude "I guess Mayo has got to go." In July 1970, Nixon appointed Mayo as head of the Federal Reserve Bank of Chicago, which allowed him to return to his adopted hometown. He retired from this role in 1981. At the time of his death in 2003, he was a board member of the Chicago YMCA.

Political offices
Preceded by Charles Zwick	Director of the Bureau of the Budget; 1969–1970	Succeeded by George Shultz as Director of the Office of Management and Budget
Other offices
Preceded by Charles Scanlon	President of the Federal Reserve Bank of Chicago; 1970–1981	Succeeded by Silas Keehn
