= Alliage =

Alliage may refer to:

- Alloy (alliage in French), a mixture or metallic solid solution composed of two or more elements
- Alliage (band), a French boy band from 1996 to 2000
- Alliage (film), 1985 film directed by André Almuró
- Alliage (culture, science, technique), journal founded and directed by Jean-Marc Lévy-Leblond
- "Alliage", brand of wine by Byington Vineyard
- Alliage, 1960 electronic music by Jan Boerman
- Estée Lauder Aliage fragrance, also sold as Alliage
