= Rootstock =

Plant root system

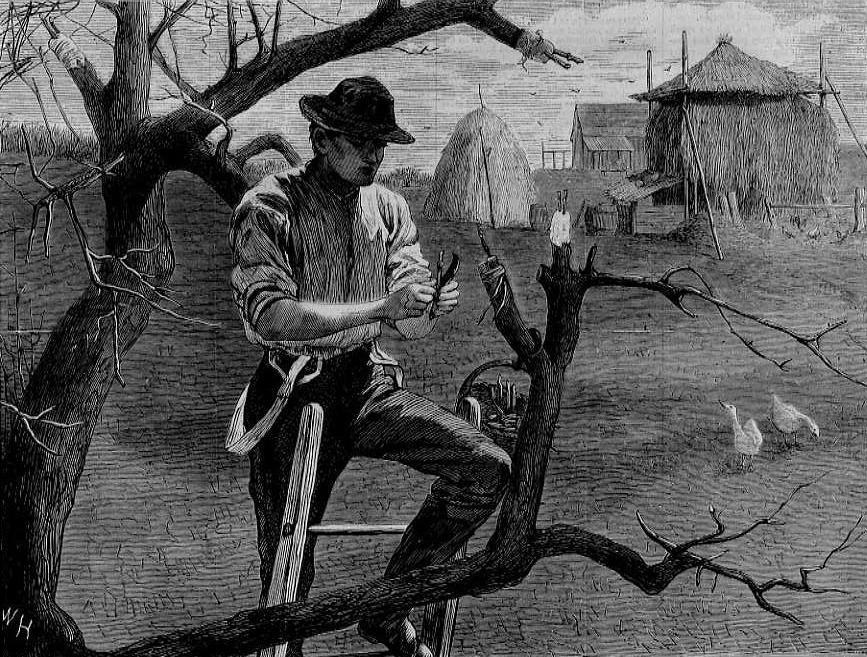
Grafting, 1870, by Winslow Homer—an example of grafting

A rootstock is part of a plant, often an underground part, from which new above-ground growth can be produced. In grafting, it refers to a plant, sometimes just a stump, which already has an established, healthy root system, onto which a cutting or a bud from another plant is grafted.

In some cases, such as vines of grapes and other berries, cuttings may be used for rootstocks, the roots being established in nursery conditions before planting them out. Although grafting has been practiced for many hundreds of years, most orchard rootstocks in current use were developed in the 20th century. The use of rootstocks is most commonly associated with fruiting plants and trees, and is useful for mass propagating many other types of plants that do not breed true from seed, or are particularly susceptible to disease when grown on their own roots.

== Terminology ==
A rootstock is part of a plant, often an underground part, from which new above-ground growth can be produced. It could also be described as a stem with a well developed root system, to which a bud from another plant is grafted. It can refer to a rhizome or underground stem.

=== Grafting ===
In grafting, it refers to a plant, sometimes just a stump, which already has an established, healthy root system, onto which a cutting or a bud from another plant is grafted. In some cases, such as vines of grapes and other berries, cuttings may be used for rootstocks, the roots being established in nursery conditions before planting them out.

The plant part grafted onto the rootstock is usually called the scion, which has the properties the propagator desires above ground, including the photosynthetic activity and the fruit or decorative properties. The rootstock is selected for its interaction with the soil, providing the roots and the stem to support the new plant, obtaining the necessary soil water and minerals, and resisting the relevant pests and diseases. After a few weeks, the tissues of the two parts will have grown together, eventually forming a single plant. After some years, it may be difficult to detect the site of the graft although the product always contains the components of two genetically different plants.

The rootstock may be a different species from the scion, but as a rule it should be closely related; for example, many commercial pears are grown on quince rootstock. Grafting can also be done in stages; a closely related scion is grafted to the rootstock, and a less closely related scion is grafted to the first scion. Serial grafting of several scions may also be used to produce a tree that bears several different fruit cultivars, with the same rootstock taking up and distributing water and minerals to the whole system. Those with more than three varieties are known as family trees.

== History ==
Although grafting has been practiced for many hundreds of years, most orchard rootstocks in current use were developed in the 20th century.

== Uses in agriculture ==
The use of rootstocks is most commonly associated with fruiting plants and trees, and is useful for mass propagating many other types of plants that do not breed true from seed, or are particularly susceptible to disease when grown on their own roots.

A variety of rootstocks may be used for a single species or cultivar of scion because different rootstocks impart different properties, such as vigour, fruit size and precocity. Rootstocks also may be selected for traits such as resistance to drought, root pests, and diseases. Grapevines for commercial planting are most often grafted onto rootstocks to avoid damage by phylloxera, though vines available for sale to back garden viticulturists may not be.

When it is difficult to match a plant to the soil in a certain field or orchard, growers may graft a scion onto a rootstock that is compatible with the soil. It may then be convenient to plant a range of ungrafted rootstocks to see which suit the growing conditions best; the fruiting characteristics of the scion may be considered later, once the most successful rootstock has been identified. Rootstocks are studied extensively and often are sold with a complete guide to their ideal soil and climate. Growers determine the pH, mineral content, nematode population, salinity, water availability, pathogen load and sandiness of their particular soil, and select a rootstock which is matched to it. Genetic testing is increasingly common, and new cultivars of rootstock are always being developed.

=== Grape rootstock ===
AxR1 is a grape rootstock once widely used in California viticulture. Its name is an abbreviation for "Aramon Rupestris Ganzin No. 1", which in turn is based on its parentage: a cross (made by a French grape hybridizer named Ganzin) between Aramon, a Vitis vinifera cultivar, and Rupestris, an American grape species, Vitis rupestris—also used on its own as rootstock, "Rupestris St. George" or "St. George," referring to a town in the South of France, Saint Georges d'Orques, where it was popular.

It achieved a degree of notoriety in California when, after decades of recommendation as a preferred rootstock—despite repeated warnings from France and South Africa about its susceptibility (it had failed in Europe in the early 1900s)—it ultimately succumbed to phylloxera in the 1980s, requiring the replanting of most of Napa and Sonoma, with disastrous financial consequences. Those who resisted the urge to use AxR-1, such as David Bennion of Ridge Vineyards, saw their vineyards spared from phylloxera damage

=== Cactus rootstock ===
Grafting is used for cactus species difficult to grow well in cultivation, such as chlorophyll-poor forms, or slow growing forms that show abnormal growth (e.g., cristate or monstrose forms).

=== Apple rootstock ===
Apple rootstocks are used for apple trees and are often the deciding factor of the size of the tree that is grafted onto the root. Dwarfing, semi-dwarf, semi-standard and standard are the size benchmarks for the different sizes of roots that will be grown, with the standard being the largest and dwarf being the smallest. Much of the world's apple production is now using dwarf rootstocks to improve efficiency, increase density and increase yields of fruit per acre. The following is a list of the dwarfing rootstock that are commonly used today in apple production:

==== England ====
===== East Malling Research Station =====
"M" series and "MM" Malling-Merton series develop in East Malling Research Station, Kent, England.

Malling (Malling–Merton rootstocks) 7 rootstock is slightly bigger than an M26 rootstock, and also requires staking in the first several years to establish a centre leader. This rootstock is moderately susceptible to blight and collar rot. The fruit size that M7 produces is good but not as large as an M26, or M9 rootstock. This root is highly susceptible to suckering and leaning over in its later years of life, which is very annoying and causes issues for the producer.

Malling 9 rootstock is the most common and well known dwarfing rootstock. This rootstock should be planted in a well-drained site, and requires staking for the duration of its life. This rootstock is also very susceptible to fireblight and burr knots. There have been many clones made of this rootstock, including M.9 NAKB 337, M.9EMLA and M.9. Pajam.

Malling 26 rootstock will grow a larger tree than the M9 rootstock will, and is about 40-50% the size of a standard tree. This root is considered very productive and early bearing, and requires staking in the first few years of its life.

===== Malling Merton rootstocks =====
The Malling-Merton and Merton-Immune rootstocks
Name	Selected year	Introduced year	Parentage
MM 102	1931	?	Northern Spy x M 1
MM 104	1930-31	1952	M 2 x Northern Spy
MM 106	1930-32	1952	Northern Spy x M 1
MM 109	1930-31	1952	M 2 x Northern Spy
MM 111	1932	1952	Northern Spy x MI 793
MI 793			Northern Spy x M 2

Malling-Merton 106 rootstock is slightly smaller than MM 111, but is a very productive tree and has early fruiting abilities. It can be used in a variety of soil conditions because it is very hardy with moderate vigour. This rootstock must be planted in well-drained soils as it is susceptible to collar rot.

Malling-Merton 111 rootstock is one of the biggest and vigorous rootstocks that is used today in commercial orchards, and is about 80-90% the size of a standard-sized tree. It is generally quite winter hardy and produces few burr knots and root suckers. This rootstock is much less popular than it once was, because many commercial producers are now planting higher density orchards, which M111 is not conducive to.

===== Tree size =====
Size relationships
Rootstock	Relative size in Michigan.	Relative size in England. M 16 = 100	Relative size Lucas
Seedling of French crab	100		100
A 2			95
M 1	58		
M 2	66	46	62
M 4	48		67
M 5	52		
M 7	40	61	59
M 9	26	27	42
M 11			92
M 12	93		
M 13	78		
M 16	84	100	
M 25	80	78	86
M 26		31	47
M 27			28
MM 102		47	
MM 104	63	79	64
MM 106	36	59	56
MM 109	73		84
MM 111	70	83	75

==== United States ====
===== Geneva Rootstocks, Geneva =====
The Geneva (G) Rootstocks were developed in the United States at a long-running breeding program in New York. They were developed in Cornell AgriTech, Geneva in collaboration with the United States Department of Agriculture Agricultural Research Service (USDA-ARS).

The Geneva rootstocks
Name	Introduced year	Parentage	Size % a)
G 11	1999	M 26 x R 5	
G 16	1998	O 3 x Malus floribunda	35–40
G 41	2005	M 27 x R 5	30
G 65	1991	M 27 x Beauty Crab	
G 202	2002	M 27 x R 5	50
G 210	2010	O 3 x R 5	50–60
G 214	2010	R 5 x O 3	30-35
G 222	2011	R 5 x M 27	45–55
G 890	2010	R 5 x O 3	55–65
G 935	2005	O 3 x R 5	50
G 969	2010	R 5 x O 3	45-55

R 5 = Robusta 5, O 3 = Ottawa 3, M 27 = Malling 27, a) size compared to seedling of French crab.

==== Canada ====
The Canadian rootstocks., Ottawa (O), St Jean Morden Series (SJM) and SJP series
Name	Year Introduced /Station	Parentage	Size % a)	Note
O.3	1974, Ottawa Research Centre	'Robin' crab X Malling 9	45-50	
O.3A (Ottawa 3 amélioré=improved)	2007, AAFC, Research Station, St-Jean-sur-Richelieu, Quebec	mutation in the O.3 stool bed	45-50	with precocity (early fruiting), higher yield efficiency (based on yield/trunk cross-sectional area), lower suckers, and wider branch angles compare to O.3.
SJM127	2007, AAFC, Research Station, St-Jean-sur-Richelieu, Quebec	Malus baccata (L.) Borkh. variety 'Nertchinsk' X 'M 26	45	low suckering tendency, poor root anchorage,
SJP84-5231	2007, AAFC, Research Station, St-Jean-sur-Richelieu, Quebec	'R 5' x 'M 27'	30	very low suckering tendency, poor root anchorage, very dwarfing
SJM150	2007, AAFC, Research Station, St-Jean-sur-Richelieu, Quebec	Malus baccata (L.) Borkh. ('Nertchinsk') X 'M 26'		Low suckering tendency, poor root anchorage (need staking, tree support)
SJM127	2007, AAFC, Research Station, St-Jean-sur-Richelieu, Quebec	Malus baccata (L.) Borkh. ('Nertchinsk') X 'M 26'		Low suckering tendency, poor root anchorage (need staking, tree support)
SJM44	2007, AAFC, Research Station, St-Jean-sur-Richelieu, Quebec	Malus baccata (L.) Borkh. ('Nertchinsk') X 'M 9'		Low suckering tendency, poor root anchorage (need staking, tree support)

R 5 = Robusta 5, O.3 = Ottawa 3, M 26 = Malling 26, M 9 = Malling 9, M 27 = Malling 27, a) size compared to Standard size of crab (100).

== See also ==
- Propagation of grapevines
- Fruit tree propagation
- Malling series
  - Apple rootstocks
  - Cherry rootstocks
  - Pear rootstocks
  - Plum rootstocks
  - Citrus rootstock
