= Kathryn Kennedy =

California wine grower (1927–2009)

2001 Estate Cabernet label

Kathryn Kennedy (July 28, 1927 – August 23, 2009) was a California wine grower, establishing her vineyard during the growth phase in the California wine history known as "The Wine Boom of the early 1970s". While not the first woman winemaker (Zelma Long and others), Kennedy was one of the first owners of a brand to bear a woman's name in California, and one who came to the scene independent of the young women graduates of the University of California-Davis.

== Early life ==
Born 1927, Kennedy moved from Santa Cruz to Santa Clara Valley at the age of 15, earning a degree from Stanford University at the age of 19. Married, and with the first of her four children, Kathryn moved to her Saratoga property in 1949 where she later decided to plant a vineyard.

In preparation for planting her 7 acres (2.8 ha), she attended two semesters of the viticulture program at University of California, Davis. There she was advised to plant Cabernet Sauvignon on her property. This recommendation was based not only on the "Region Two" climate classification for her land in Saratoga, but also on the market projections that were held during the late 1960s.

== Viticulture and winemaking activities ==
In planting her vineyard, Kennedy had Clone #8 cuttings sourced from David Bruce Vineyards developed for one year in an on-site nursery before planting in 1973. After selling fruit for two vintages to Mount Eden Vineyards in Saratoga, Kathryn established her brand and winery in 1979. Her adviser and first winemaker was Bill Anderson, who went on to be the longstanding winemaker at Chateau Julien in Carmel Valley AVA. From 1979 until 1988 Kathryn's winery produced only Estate Cabernet.

Joining the process after the survey work of Ken Burnap and David Bennion, Kennedy contributed to modifying the boundaries of the Santa Cruz Mountains AVA, which was created in 1981. She successfully sought to include her land in this new appellation in order to be associated with the premium wine producers of this region.

== Death ==
Kennedy died August 23, 2009, at home surrounded by her family, after a long battle with cancer.

== Winery ==
Kathryn Kennedy Winery is a small winery located in Saratoga, California. It is located on 7 acres (2.8 ha) of land in the foothills of the Santa Cruz Mountains near Silicon Valley. Kathryn Kennedy Winery produces Cabernet Sauvignon, Syrah, Sauvignon blanc, and a Lateral blend.

Kennedy left the winery in the hands of her youngest son Marty Mathis, who has been winemaker since 1981. In 2003 production was expanded to include a 4000 case red blend named Lateral made in Napa Valley as well as a Sauvignon blanc made from organic grapes. The Estate Vineyard was certified organic in time for the 2007 vintage.

== See also ==
- List of wine personalities
