= Santa Cruz County wine =

Appelation that designates wine in Santa Cruz County, CA

Coordinates: 37°02′47″N 122°08′57″W

- Wine region
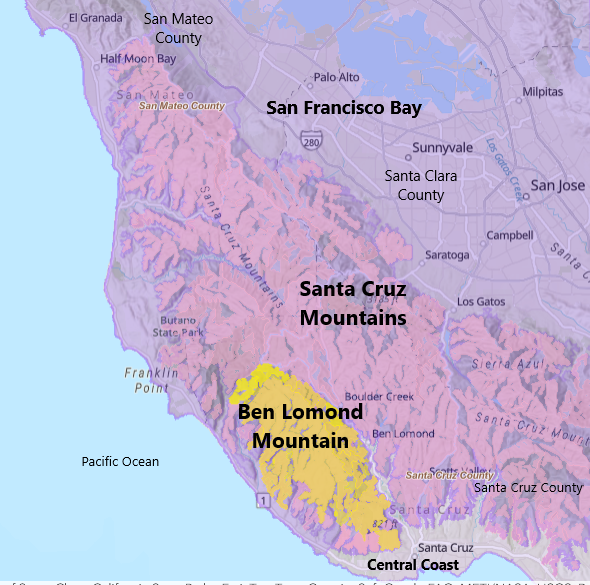
- Santa Cruz County AVAs
- Type: U.S. County Appellation
- Year established: 1850
- Years of wine industry: 173
- Country: United States
- Part of: California, Central Coast AVA, San Francisco Bay AVA
- Sub-regions: Ben Lomond Mountain AVA, Santa Cruz Mountains AVA
- Growing season: 210 days
- Precipitation (annual average): 60 inches (1,524 mm)
- Total area: 284,800 acres (445 sq mi)
- Size of planted vineyards: 3,650 acres (1,477 ha)
- No. of vineyards: about 340
- Grapes produced: Pinot gris/Grigio, Pinot noir, Viognier
- No. of wineries: 76
- Comments: as of 2024

Santa Cruz County wine is an appellation that designates wine made from grapes grown in Santa Cruz County, California located south of San Francisco and San Mateo counties and west of Santa Clara County lying entirely within the expansive multi-county Central Coast viticultural area. County names in the United States automatically qualify as legal appellations of origin for wine produced from grapes grown in that county and do not require registration with the Alcohol and Tobacco Tax and Trade Bureau (TTB), Treasury. TTB was created in January of 2003, when the Bureau of Alcohol, Tobacco and Firearms, or ATF, was extensively reorganized under the provisions of the Homeland Security Act of 2002.

Santa Cruz County is renowned internationally for its scenic vistas with the California Coast Ranges forming the mountainous shoreline and wind-swept evergreens on coastal cliffs outlined by the cinematic Pacific Coast Highway (PCH) enveloped by the Californian maritime weather. These elements provide ideal terrain, climate, and soil creating unique microclimates throughout the county for a vibrant viticulture economy. The county is situated on a wide coastline with over 29 miles (47 km) of beaches. The strip is about ten miles (16 km) wide between the Pacific Coast and the crest of the Santa Cruz Mountains stretching south to form the northern shore of Monterey Bay. It can be divided roughly into four regions: the rugged "north coast"; the urban City of Santa Cruz, Soquel, Capitola, and Aptos; mountainous Bonny Doon, San Lorenzo River Valley; and the fertile "south county", including Watsonville and Corralitos.
Agriculture is concentrated in the coastal lowlands of the county's northern and southern ends. Most of the north coastal land comprises relatively flat terraces against steep cliffs. Total county acreage is 284,800 acres (445 sq mi) with 3,650 acres (1,477 ha) cultivated on about 340 small vineyards growing 2,210 acres (894 ha) of red varietals and 1,440 acres (583 ha) of white, sourcing, as of 2024, 76 wineries within the county.

== History ==
The area has been recorded as the "Santa Cruz Mountains" since 1838. As early as 1867, when the first government surveyor laid section lines in the area, the vineyards of the region were noted. Moreover, numerous books and articles dealing with wine refer to the "Santa Cruz Mountains" as a specific grape-growing region. Testimony was also received which indicated that although the area encompassed parts of three counties, the "Santa Cruz Mountains" constitutes a well-defined area forming a distinct geographical and phytogeographical unit. ATF believed this testimony established the historical and current use of the name where Santa Cruz Mountains is a distinguishable region and is the most appropriate for the viticultural area."

The history of wine growing in the Santa Cruz Mountains goes back to the 1860s when George Jarvis first planted significant vineyards. By the 1870s there were 16 vintners in Santa Cruz County and by the late 1880s there were thirty-eight wineries. Santa Cruz Mountains wineries started to receive awards and gain international recognition. Ben Lomond Wine Co., operated by William Coope, and Dr. John Stewart won prizes at World’s Fairs in Paris in 1889, Chicago in 1893, and San Francisco in 1894.
In the 1880s, vine acreage increased fivefold in the Santa Cruz Mountains. Quality Santa Cruz Mountains wines came from Santa Clara and San Mateo counties as well. However, prohibition soon marked the end of California's international reputation as a quality wine district. Prohibition began in 1919, forbidding the “manufacture, sale, or transportation of intoxicating liquors” and lasted until December 5, 1933. Afterward, growers began replanting fine wine variety vineyards, but it was decades later that modern winemaking was adopted, enabling the Santa Cruz Mountains to regain its status as a national premier wine growing region. Many California's wine-growing pioneers were based here, including Paul Masson, Martin Ray, and Charles Le Franc. The appellation was the first in the U.S. to be defined by geophysical and climatic factors. While the Santa Cruz Mountains began as a well-kept secret, its wines increasingly became better-known and more widely recognized among wine enthusiasts and the general public.
In the 1960s and early 1970s, the quality of some California wines was outstanding but few took notice as the market favored French brands. At the legendary Judgement of Paris blind tasting event on 24 May 1976, celebrating the United States Bicentennial and judged by renown French oenophiles, California vintages in white and red wine categories ranked 1st besting acclaimed French wines. Also the 1971 Ridge Vineyards Monte Bello Cabernet from the Santa Cruz Mountains ranked 5th. The identical vintage ranked 3rd in an anniversary event at the San Francisco Wine Tasting of 1978 and ranked 1st in the Judgment of Paris 30th anniversary tastings on both sides of the Atlantic Ocean in 2006.

Ben Lomond Mountain was first pioneered by Scotsman John Burns, who named the area in the 1860s recalling the Scottish wine-growing region. Burns was the first vintner in the area with limited commercial success until the 1880s, setting the example for several other families. Commercial winegrowing began in the Ben Lomond Mountain region in 1883 with the foundation of the Ben Lomond Wine Company by F.W. Billings. The Ben Lomond Wine Company, under the management of Billings' son-in-law, J.F. Coope, brought the Ben Lomond Mountain wines out of the obscurity of the remote mountain area to stand with other quality wines in California. By 1891, approximately 400 acres (162 ha) of wine cultivation were on Ben Lomond Mountain, though the Ben Lomond Mountain wine industry declined after the turn of the century. By the end of World War II, only the 75-acre (30 ha) Locatelli Ranch vineyard and the 40-acre (16 ha) Quistorff vineyard remained. Both had been abandoned by the mid-1960's.

During the 1970s, Ben Lomond Mountain experienced a viticultural renaissance in and around the town of Bonny Doon. In 1972, the University of California Agricultural Extension Service released a study of climatologically prime growing areas for several commercial crops, including wine grapes. This study, entitled "California's Central Coast: Its Terrain, Climate, and Agro-Climate. Implications," established Ben Lomond Mountain as being a prime growing region for wine grape production. This report stirred the interest of several individuals in the region. Since then, nine separate vineyard operations have been established within the Ben Lomond Mountain viticultural area.

== Terroir ==
Ridge Monte Bello Vineyards

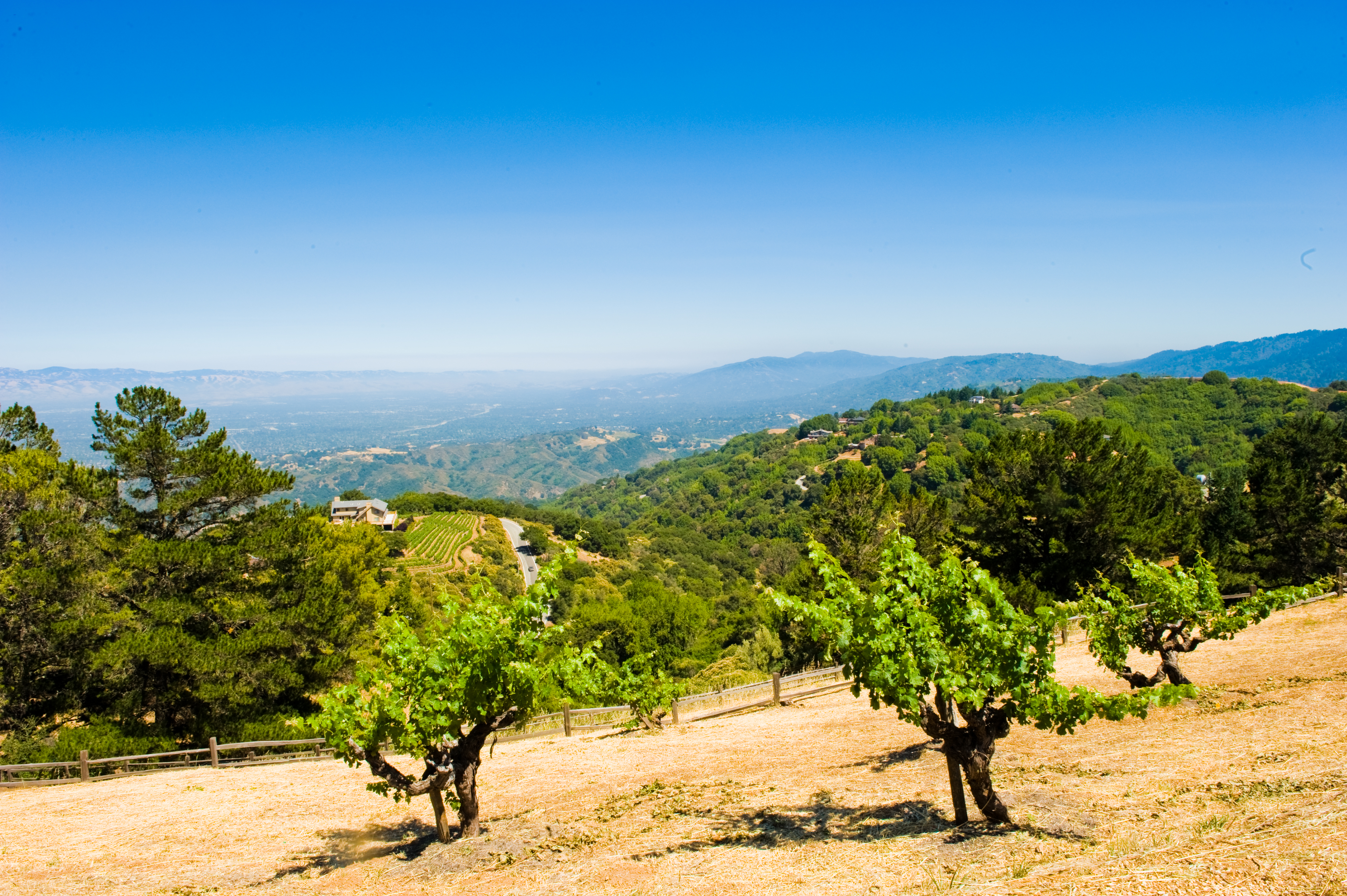
Santa Cruz Mountains from Ridge Vineyards

A viticultural area should possess geographical features which distinguishes it as an appellation of origin in wine labeling and advertising. Section 4.25a(e)(1) defines an American viticultural area as a delimited grape-growing region distinguishable by geographic characteristics. Section 4.25a(e)(2) outlines the procedures for proposing an American viticultural area. Any interested person may petition TTB to establish a grape-growing region as a viticultural area. The Santa Cruz Mountains Vintners submitted a petition to establish a viticultural area in portions of San Mateo, Santa Clara, and Santa Cruz counties to be named "Santa Cruz Mountains." In response to this petition, ATF published a notice of proposed rule-making, Notice No. 360, in the Federal Register on December 15, 1980 (45 FR 82275), proposing the establishment of the Santa Cruz Mountains as a viticultural area. The petitioner claimed the "Santa Cruz Mountains" possesses a soil type, climate, and protective setting which provides a singular viticultural identity. The petitioner stated that the "Santa Cruz Mountains" is characterized by a climate which is greatly influenced in the western portion by the Pacific Ocean breezes and fog movements, and in the eastern portion by the moderating influences of the San Francisco Bay. These two influences tend to produce weather which is generally cool during the growing season. Temperatures in the slopes of the hillsides where most of the vineyards are located appear to vary from that at the lower elevations. This is caused by the marine influence coming off the Pacific Ocean which cools the mountains at night much more than the valley floor. The area is characterized by a growing season in excess of 300 days. This is apparently due to cool air coming down the mountains forcing warmer air upward, thereby lengthening the season in which the necessary conditions for grape-growing are present. Moreover, while the climate, in terms of temperature can be characterized as mild, the Santa Cruz Mountains has an average rainfall much greater than the surrounding areas.

Ben Lomond Mountain AVA is particularly distinguishable by climatological evidence. Ben Lomond Mountain presents the first major obstruction to marine weather patterns. Winter storms lose much of their moisture on the western slope of coastal hills and mountains where the warm, moisture- laden marine air is lifted and cools, precipitating in fogs or rainfall. As a result, Ben Lomond Mountain draws much of the precipitation from marine air that moves onshore between the city of Santa Cruz and Ano Nuevo Point. Consequently, Ben Lomond Mountain receives the highest average amount of precipitation in Santa Cruz County at 60 inches (1,524 mm).
During the summer, the mountain forms a barrier against the low-lying fogs that inundate the shore and coastal valleys. This fog belt generally rests between the 400-and-800-foot (122 and 244 m) elevation along the western slope of Ben Lomond Mountain. Above this level, the marine air climate tends to give way to a low mountain climate where abundant sunshine is characteristic of the summer months.

The soils in the proposed area were identified as Franciscan shale which is unique to this particular area south of San Francisco. The soil is basically residual material from the decomposition of bedrock and the soil types in the area differ depending on the type of underlying bedrock. Generally, these residual soils tend to be thin and stony, and somewhat excessively drained. They were characterized as impoverished. making it extremely difficult to grow grapes. This contrasts greatly with the soil of the surrounding area which is primarily alluvium and is more fertile. Based on this evidence, ATF determined that the Santa Cruz Mountains is viticulturally distinguishable from the surrounding areas. This is based upon the evidence presented regarding the rainfall, soil, and general climate. Therefore, Santa Cruz Mountains can be seen as a defined area exhibiting features and characteristics unique to its boundaries when compared to the surrounding area.
The geophysical boundaries of the Ben Lomond Mountain region become apparent when examining the geologic stratigraphy of the area. Ben Lomond Mountain consists of a large geologic structure known as a pluton, composed primarily of granitic rocks (quartz diorite), with some intrusions of metamorphic rocks (quartzite and pelific schists). This plutonic structure distinguishes Ben Lomond Mountain from surrounding areas and is unique within viticulturally viable growing areas in the Santa Cruz Mountains. The bedrock formations are covered at the lower elevations and isolated tablelands by depositions of sandstone, primarily Santa Margarita sandstone and to a lesser extent Santa Cruz Mudstone. The combination of the granitic quartz diorite and metasedimentary rock structures with the sandstone deposits and forest detritus forms a variety of soil complexes which are generally described as slightly acidic, sandy loams. The resultant topsoil complexes are well-drained and deep, lending themselves readily to successful viticulture as demonstrated by past and present vineyards in the area.

== County Viticultural Areas _{(as of 2025)} ==
- Santa Cruz Mountains (Est. Dec 1981, 19,200 acres (30 sq mi))
- Central Coast (Est. Oct 1985, 1.42 million acres (2,219 sq mi)
- Ben Lomond Mountain (Est. Jan 1988, 640,000 acres (1,000 sq mi))
- San Francisco Bay (Est. Dec 1999, 1,586,720.00 acres (2,479.25 sq mi)

== See also ==
- California wine
