= Charlie Rosen =

Charlie Rosen may refer to:

- Charlie Rosen (engineer) (1937–2007), American metallurgical engineer
- Charlie Rosen (musician) (born 1990), American jazz and classical musician

== See also ==
- Charley Rosen (1941–2025), American basketball coach and author
- Charles Rosen (disambiguation)
