= Paul Draper (winemaker) =

American winemaker

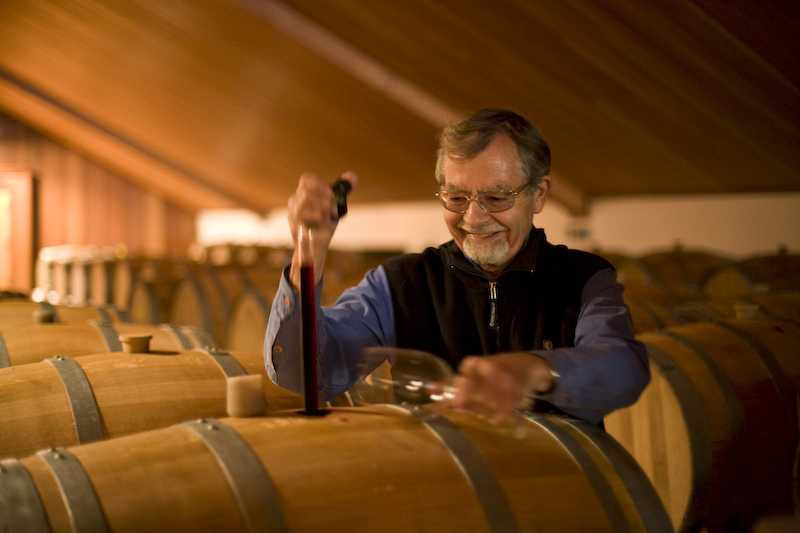
- Paul Draper thieving wine from a barrel at Ridge Monte Bello.
- Born: 1936 (age 89–90); Evanston, Illinois
- Occupation: winemaker

Paul Draper (born March 10, 1936) is a California winemaker, and has been the chief winemaker at Ridge Vineyards in California since 1969. Without any formal training in winemaking, Draper first gained notice for his 1971 Monte Bello Cabernet Sauvignon when it placed fifth at the Judgment of Paris wine tasting. Draper played a role in the history of California wine through his work in popularizing "vineyard-designated" wines, as well as instigating the resurgence of old vine Zinfandel. Along with Ravenswood Winery's Joel Peterson, Draper is considered one of the more notable figures in the history of Californian Zinfandel. Draper was featured in a short film, Terroir, and directed by Christopher McGilvray which was shown at the 2017 Cinequest Film Festival.

== Early history ==
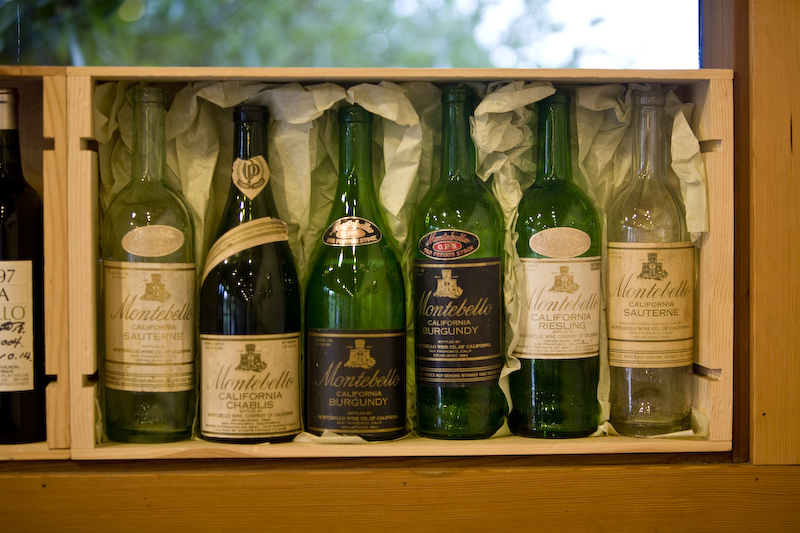
An assortment of early Ridge wines made by the MonteBello winery that preceded the establishment of Ridge Vineyards.

Born in Evanston, Illinois in 1936, Draper was raised on a farm and exposed to agriculture at an early age. He graduated from The Choate School (now Choate Rosemary Hall) in Wallingford, Connecticut and Stanford University, where he majored in philosophy and became aware of Ridge Vineyard, which was owned by a group of Stanford Research Institute engineers. After graduation in 1959, Draper joined the United States Army, where he was stationed at Italy. During that time, Draper rode through the Italian countryside on a motorcycle, learning about the local culture, cuisine and wine. Following his release from the Army, he spent some time at Sorbonne studying French cuisine and nutrition. On his return to the United States, Draper went to work for at Chateau Souverain in Napa Valley as a cellar assistant with the harvest.

The next year, Draper went to Chile as part of a Peace Corps mission where he leased a Chilean winery with Fritz Maytag, a fellow volunteer and friend from Stanford. He went to local vineyards, where he got first hand experience with winemaking. During this time he also read books on winemaking to expand his knowledge of the field. In 1968, he traveled to Bordeaux where he discussed winemaking with the maître de chai of Château Latour. The experience gave him the confidence he needed to meet with David Bennion and accept the chief winemaking position at Ridge Vineyards in 1969.

== Ridge Vineyards ==
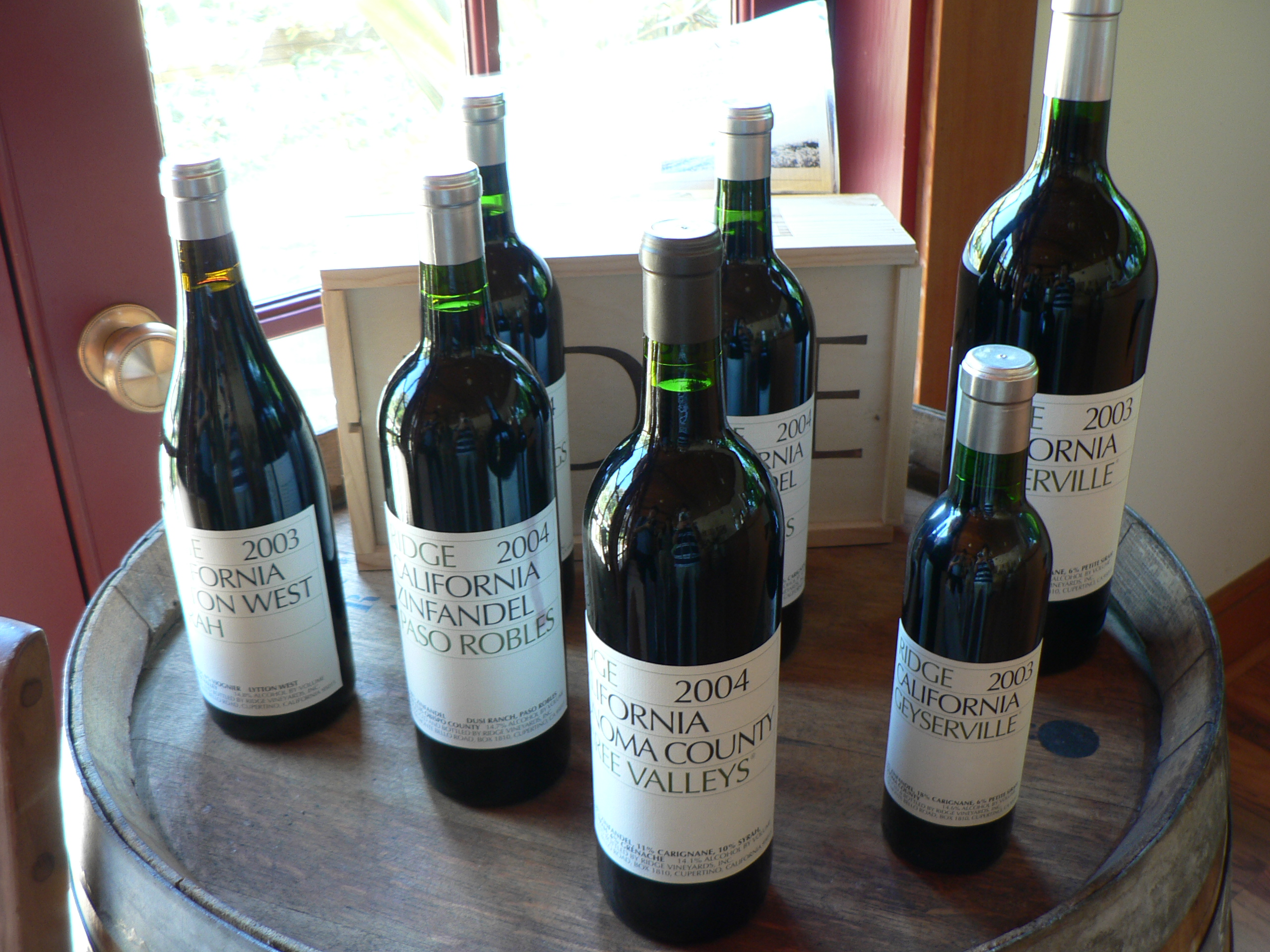
An assortment of Ridge wines made by Paul Draper, each with a distinctive "no frills" style wine label.

While Ridge had some success with Cabernet, the mission that Draper was charged with was to make Ridge "respectable". One of the first tasks that he set about was in modernizing the facilities of a winery that was first built in 1886. He then went to focus on Ridge's Cabernet Sauvignon and became an advocate of the potential of cool climate Cabernet in contrast to the very ripe, highly alcoholic styles that came out of warmer climates. Located in the Santa Cruz Mountains AVA, the high altitude of Ridge's vineyards as well as its proximity to the Pacific Ocean created a cooler climate that was distinctly different from that found in Napa Valley or Sonoma County. Draper also embraced the French wine concept of terroir and began producing single-vineyard wine that was designated on the wine label with the name of that vineyard. As the reputation of his wine grew, consumers soon began to recognize names such as Monte Bello, Picchetti Vineyard, Jimsomare and Geyserville from their vineyard-designated bottlings.

The style of Draper's Ridge Cabernets is often compared to more Old World styles like Bordeaux and have been reviewed by critics in favorable comparisons to the wines of the First Growths. That is a style that Draper actively tries to parallel and would often serve blind tastings of his Monte Bello Cabernet with a bottle of Château Latour to get feedback on the differences between the two. Draper retired as the CEO and Winemaker of Ridge Vineyards in 2016, but remained on as the chairman of the board.

=== Judgement of Paris ===
The 1971 Monte Bello Cabernet Sauvignon was selected by organizer Steven Spurrier to take part in his 1976 blind tasting that would pit the best of California wines against the best of France's wines. On the tasting notes, Draper describes the 1971 vintage as the first vintage that they were able to achieve balance in the wine with less sugar in the grapes prior to harvest and the benefit of small amounts of Merlot, Petit Verdot and Cabernet franc. The wine was fermented dry with extended skin contact and then put through malolactic fermentation and aged in small American oak barrels. The wine was expected to hit its peak after 6 years in the bottle. Prior to the tasting, Spurrier expected the Ridge Monte Bello to be the best performing American red. In the final results it ended up being the fifth best overall red wine (and second best American wine) after Stag's Leap Wine Cellars, Château Mouton Rothschild, Château Montrose and Château Haut-Brion.

In the 2006 rematch, the 1971 Ridge was the highest ranked red wine beating out the 1973 Stag's tastings of the same vintage wine as the original competition. A second tasting was held of more recent vintage wine in which the 2000 Monte Bello red wine came in second place behind a 2000 Château Margaux.

=== Influence on California Zinfandel ===
In the late 1960s and early 1970s, Zinfandel was primarily a jug wine grape. Draper sensed the potential of the wine if grown in the right spot and with low yields. Prior to his arrival, Ridge had been making some Zinfandel in small quantities, often blended with Carignane and Petite Sirah, but it was never much of a focus. Elsewhere, in California the grape was also drawing little interest from "serious" winemakers. Remembering the lessons he learned in Europe about the benefits of "old vines", particularly with keeping low yields, he went looking for some of the oldest vines of Zinfandel that he could find and found several vineyards with plantings from the 1880s-1900s. Over the course of his career he would uncover other "ideal" spots for Zinfandel including Spring Mountain, Howell Mountain, Dry Creek Valley, Mendocino, Lodi, Paso Robles, Amador County and Geyserville. While many of these areas had long histories of Zinfandel production, most of these areas never received much recognition until Draper and Ridge began using them and touting their terroir with vineyard-designated wines.

== Winemaking philosophy ==
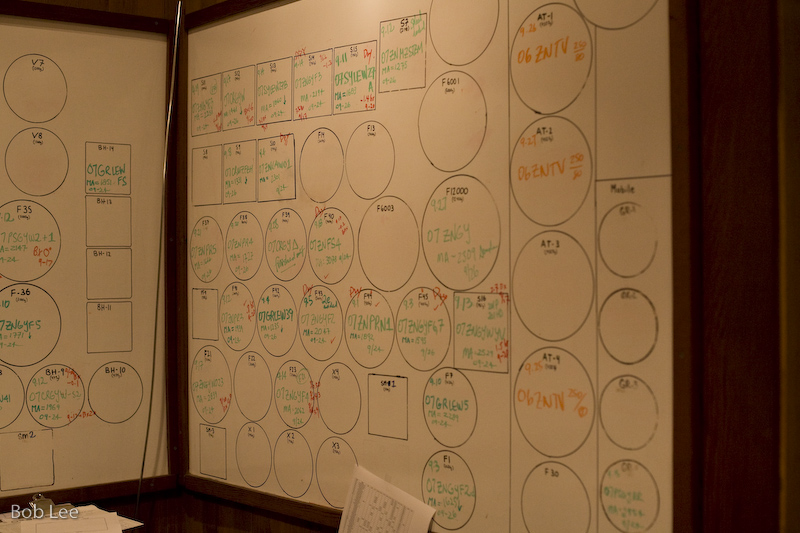
Charts used during wine making at Ridge Monte Bello.

Draper is an advocate of natural winemaking, though Ridge is not a certified organic winery. He claims this stems from his desire to let the vineyards "express themselves" and their terroir without over intrusiveness by man. He has criticized overly-powerful, oak, and highly alcoholic wines made from excessively ripe fruit, preferring his wines to be more about balance. He has also criticized high wine prices and consumers who purchase wine for speculating purposes rather than to enjoy them. He has been a harsh critic of the UC Davis Department of Viticulture and Enology in their emphasis of more "industrial winemaking" versus the methods that he prefers. In contrast to other California Cabernets, Draper's wines are normally around 13% ABV which is low, even in comparison to Bordeaux wines. Though his wines are often more of a French style, he has preferred to use American oak.

== Honors ==
- 2000: Wine Spectator Distinguished Service Award
- 2005: Wein Gourmet Lifetime Achievement Award, Germany
- 2006: San Francisco Chronicle Winemaker of the Year

== See also ==
- List of wine personalities
