= Charles Rosen (disambiguation) =

Charles Rosen (1927–2012) was an American pianist and writer.

Charles Rosen may also refer to:

- Charles Rosen (painter) (1878–1950), American painter
- Charles Rosen (scientist) (1917–2002), artificial-intelligence expert

== See also ==
- Charlie Rosen (disambiguation)
