= Hewitt Crane =

American inventor (1927–2008)

Hewitt D. Crane
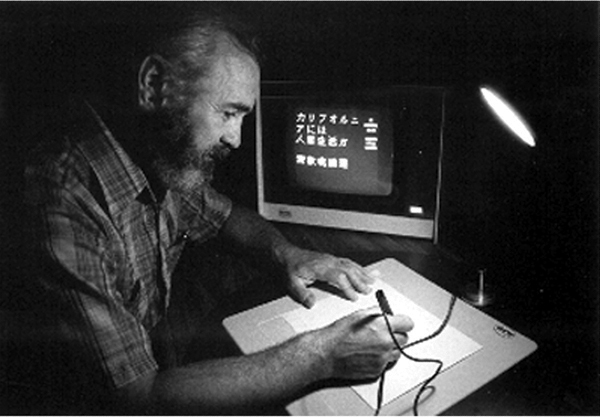
- Hewitt Crane demonstrates pen-input computing for writing Japanese characters at SRI International
- Born: 1927; Jersey City, New Jersey
- Died: June 17, 2008 (aged 81); Portola Valley, California
- Employer(s): United States Navy; IBM; Institute for Advanced Study; RCA Laboratories; SRI International; Ridge Vineyards
- Known for: Electronic Recording Machine, Accounting
- Awards: IEEE Fellow

Hewitt D. Crane (1927–2008) was an American engineer best known for his pioneering work at SRI International on ERMA (Electronic Recording Machine, Accounting), for Bank of America, magnetic digital logic, neuristor logic, the development of an eye-movement tracking device, and a pen-input device for computers.

== Early life and career ==
Crane was born in 1927 in Jersey City, New Jersey. After a stint in the United States Navy as a radar technician during World War II, he worked as a computer maintenance technician for IBM (1949–1952), followed by working on digital computer design under the leadership of John von Neumann at the Institute for Advanced Study, in Princeton, New Jersey (IAS is not affiliated with Princeton University).

He then developed magnetic multiaperture devices (MADs) at RCA Laboratories (now Sarnoff Corporation). In order to develop magnetic logic, Crane controlled the direction of bit flow in magnetic ferrite memory cores. Ferrite logic circuits are inherently more stable than vacuum tubes and transistors, draw no power when unused, and are impervious to electromagnetic interference. In 1959, Crane introduced the all-magnetic logic approach at the Fall Joint Computer Conference, eventually leading to a demonstration of the world's first all-magnetic computer in 1961. The technology was soon commercialized by Aircraft Marine Products (AMP) Inc., under license from SRI, and used primarily in the rapid transit system of New York City and at railroad switching yards, where electro-magnetic interference made electronic computers unfeasible. The development and growth of planar transistors in silicon chips and integrated circuits displaced magnetic core logic, although it may still be useful for extended space missions and other extreme conditions, but using integrated circuit manufacturing techniques (e.g. etching and deposition of a substrate, and not an assembly of discrete magnetic cores). The prototype of the first all-magnetic computer now resides at the Computer History Museum, in Mountain View, California.

Douglas Engelbart worked with Crane on magnetic logic devices beginning in 1957, before Engelbart moved on to work on hypermedia and augmenting the human intellect with computers, and before Crane began research on replicating human functions with digital computers. In addition to his engineering work at SRI, Crane cofounded Communication Intelligence Corporation (CIC), to commercialize computer-based handwriting recognition on graphics tablets. CIC's "Jot" handwriting recognition software was later acquired by Palm and renamed Graffiti 2.

== Later career ==
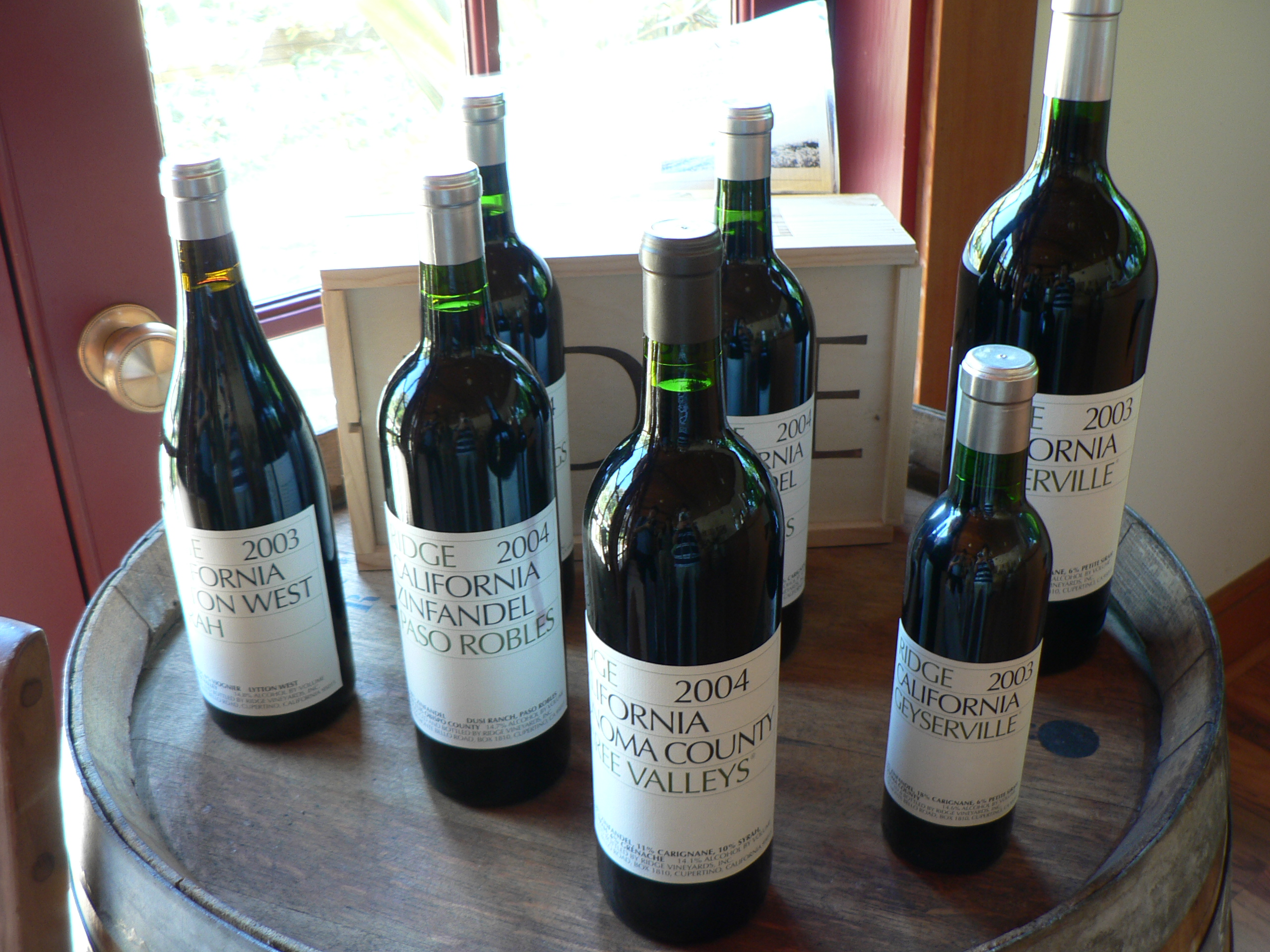
Assorted bottles from Ridge, the winery co-founded by Crane.

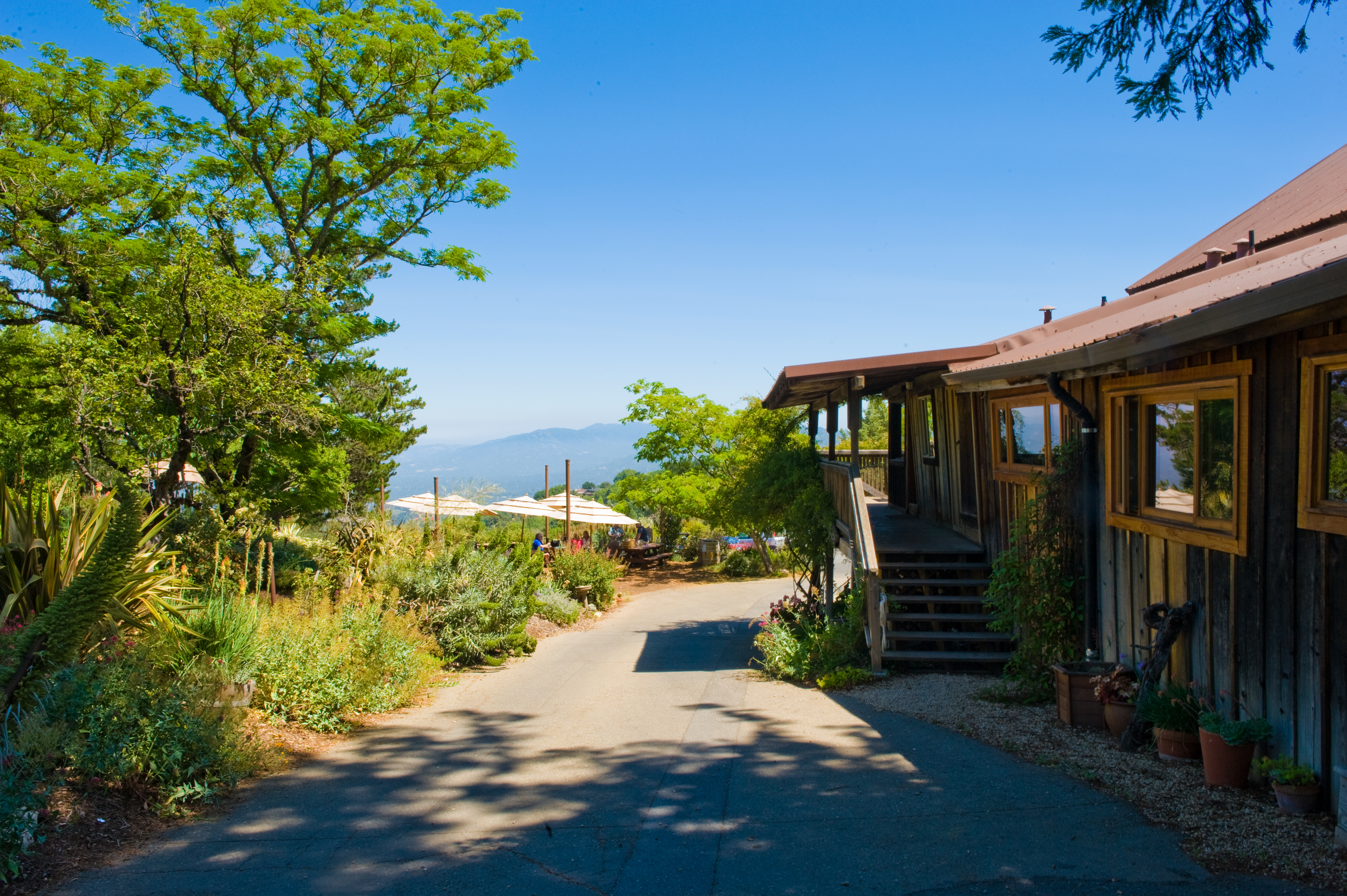
Ridge Winery, which was co-founded by Hewitt Crane.

In 1959, with fellow SRI engineers David Bennion, Charles Rosen, and Howard Zeidler, Crane co-founded Ridge Vineyards. One of its red wines placed fifth in the Judgment of Paris wine tasting.

Crane's last intellectual effort was promoting the use of a cubic mile of oil as an energy measure and issues related to energy development. In 2010 in collaboration with SRI-International colleagues, Ed Kinderman, and Ripudaman Malhotra, he wrote a book on the topic. A cubic mile of oil is the approximate yearly consumption of oil and Crane and his co-authors examine the possible replacements with other sources, for example, it would require building 32,850 wind turbines or 52 nuclear power plants annually for fifty years to replace one cubic mile of oil.

Crane died from complications of Alzheimer's disease on June 17, 2008, at his home in Portola Valley, California.

== Memberships and awards ==
Crane was named an IEEE Fellow in 1968.
