= Ben Lomond Mountain AVA =

Appellation that designates wine in Santa Cruz County, California

Coordinates: 37°02′44″N 122°09′06″W

Ben Lomond Mountain
- Wine region
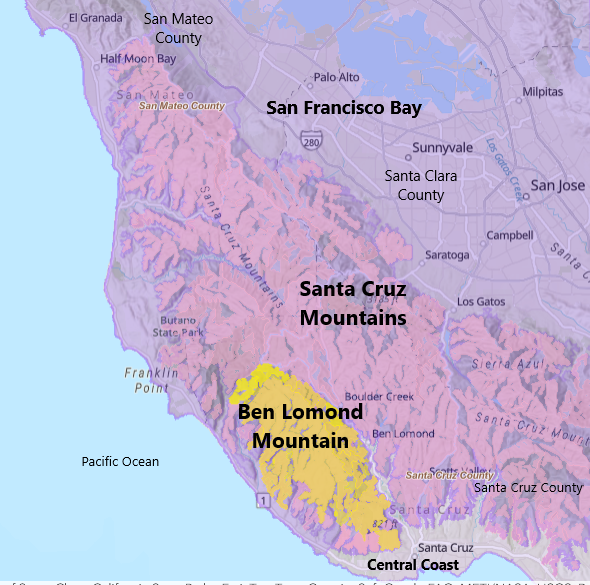
- Santa Cruz County AVAs
- Type: American Viticultural Area
- Year established: 1987
- Years of wine industry: 143
- Country: United States
- Part of: California, Central Coast, San Francisco Bay AVA, Santa Cruz County, Santa Cruz Mountains AVA
- Growing season: 210 days
- Climate region: Region Ib
- Heat units: 2,180 GDD units
- Precipitation (annual average): 60 inches (1,524 mm)
- Soil conditions: slightly acidic, sandy loams
- Total area: 38,400 acres (60 sq mi)
- Size of planted vineyards: 69.5 acres (28.1 ha)
- No. of vineyards: 11
- Grapes produced: Cabernet Sauvignon, Chardonnay, Pinot Noir, Zinfandel
- No. of wineries: 3

Ben Lomond Mountain is an American Viticultural Area (AVA) located in Santa Cruz County, California on the coastal edge of the Santa Cruz Mountains. It was established as the nation's 97^{th}, the states's 57^{th} and the county's third appellation on December 7, 1987 by the Bureau of Alcohol, Tobacco and Firearms (ATF), Treasury after evaluating the petition submitted by Mr. Michael R. Holland to establish a viticultural area to be named "Ben Lomond Mountain."

It lies within the boundaries of the vast 1.42-million-acre (2,219 sq mi) multi-county Central Coast and the local Santa Cruz Mountains viticultural areas. Ben Lomond Mountain AVA encompasses approximately 38,400 acres (60 sq mi) where, at the outset, nine separate vineyard operations were established with approximately 69.5 acres (28.1 ha) under vine. In addition, two other vineyards were in development stages with a proposed planting of 330 acres (134 ha).

== History ==
Ben Lomond Mountain was first pioneered by Scotsman John Burns, who named the area in the 1860s recalling the Scottish wine-growing region. Burns was the first vintner in the area with limited commercial success until the 1880s, setting the example for several other families. Commercial winegrowing began in the Ben Lomond Mountain region in 1883 with the foundation of the Ben Lomond Wine Company by F.W. Billings. The Ben Lomond Wine Company, under the management of Billings' son-in-law, J.F. Coope, brought the Ben Lomond Mountain wines out of the obscurity of the remote mountain area to stand with other quality wines in California. In 1887, Coope wrote "Ben Lomond (Mountain) as a wine district is yet in its infancy and is struggling to establish a name for itself in that industry. The wine yield of 1886 for Ben Lomond Wine Company was 280,000 US gallons (1,059,915 L), chiefly Riesling, part of which was grown (by the Ben Lomond Wine Company), while a part was purchased (from neighboring vineyards)." By 1891, approximately 400 acres (162 ha) of wine cultivation were on Ben Lomond Mountain. The Ben Lomond Mountain wine industry declined after the turn of the century. By the end of World War II, only the 75-acre (30 ha) Locatelli Ranch vineyard and the 40-acre (16 ha) Quistorff vineyard remained. Both had been abandoned by the mid-1960's.

During the 1970s, Ben Lomond Mountain experienced a viticultural renaissance in and around the town of Bonny Doon. In 1972, the University of California Agricultural Extension Service released a study of climatologically prime growing areas for several commercial crops, including wine grapes. This study, entitled "California's Central Coast: Its Terrain, Climate, and Agro-Climate. Implications," established Ben Lomond Mountain as being a prime growing region for wine grape production. This report stirred the interest of several individuals in the region. Since then, nine separate vineyard operations have been established within the Ben Lomond Mountain viticultural area. The mountainous terroir ranges in altitudes from 1,300 to 2,600 feet (396–792 m) above sea level, placing it above the fog that rolls in from the Pacific Ocean, ensuring long hours of sunlight and extended growing season.

== Terroir ==
=== Topography ===
Ben Lomond Mountain rises directly from the California coastline to an altitude of 2,630 feet (802 m) above sea level. This mountain region is bordered by the Pacific Ocean to the west, the San Lorenzo River Basin to the east, the city of Santa Cruz (and river mouth of the San Lorenzo) to the south, and Scott Creek and Jamison Creek on the northwest and northeast sides, respectively. The Ben Lomond Mountain viticultural area is approximately 15 miles (24 km)long and an average of four miles (6 km) wide, defined by its borders which generally coincide with the 800-foot (244 m) elevation level.

=== Climate ===
Ben Lomond Mountain AVA is particularly distinguishable by climatological evidence. Ben Lomond Mountain presents the first major obstruction to marine weather patterns. Winter storms lose much of their moisture on the western slope of coastal hills and mountains where the warm, moisture- laden marine air is lifted and cools, precipitating in fogs or rainfall. As a result, Ben Lomond Mountain draws much of the precipitation from marine air that moves onshore between the city of Santa Cruz and Ano Nuevo Point. Consequently, Ben Lomond Mountain receives the highest average amount of precipitation in Santa Cruz County at 60 inches (1,524 mm).
During the summer, the mountain forms a barrier against the low-lying fogs that inundate the shore and coastal valleys. This fog belt generally rests between the 400-and-800-foot (122 and 244 m) elevation along the western slope of Ben Lomond Mountain. Above this level, the marine air climate tends to give way to a low mountain climate where abundant sunshine is characteristic of the summer months.
The 1972 University of California climatological study of prime growing areas for commercial crops demonstrates the suitability of the climate afforded by Ben Lomond Mountain for wine grape production. Of special interest is the delineation of a "premium wine grape production thermal" existing along the ridgeline of the mountain above 1,500 feet (457 m). The USDA plant hardiness zone range is 9a to 10a.

=== Soils ===
The geophysical boundaries of the Ben Lomond Mountain region become apparent when examining the geologic stratigraphy of the area. Ben Lomond Mountain consists of a large geologic structure known as a pluton, composed primarily of granitic rocks (quartz diorite), with some intrusions of metamorphic rocks (quartzite and pelific schists). This plutonic structure distinguishes Ben Lomond Mountain from surrounding areas and is unique within viticulturally viable growing areas in the Santa Cruz Mountains. The bedrock formations are covered at the lower elevations and isolated tablelands by depositions of sandstone, primarily Santa Margarita sandstone and to a lesser extent Santa Cruz Mudstone. The combination of the granitic quartz diorite and metasedimentary rock structures with the sandstone deposits and forest detritus forms a variety of soil complexes which are generally described as slightly acidic, sandy loams. The resultant topsoil complexes are well-drained and deep, lending themselves readily to successful viticulture as demonstrated by past and present vineyards in the area.
