= Santa Cruz Mountains AVA =

American Viticultural Area (AVA)

Coordinates: 37°18′07″N 122°06′53″W

- Wine region
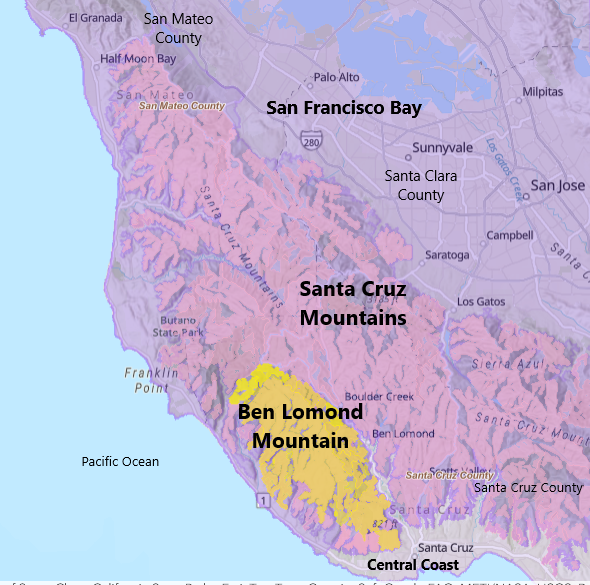
- Santa Cruz County AVAs
- Type: American Viticultural Area
- Year established: 1981
- Years of wine industry: 189
- Country: United States
- Part of: California, Central Coast, San Francisco Bay AVA, Santa Cruz County
- Sub-regions: Ben Lomond Mountain AVA
- Growing season: 300 days
- Climate region: Region I
- Heat units: 1,237 GDD units
- Precipitation (annual average): 3 inches (85 mm)
- Soil conditions: Franciscan shale and clay
- Total area: 480,000 acres (750 sq mi)
- Size of planted vineyards: 1,500 acres (607 ha)
- No. of vineyards: over 200
- Grapes produced: Cabernet Franc, Cabernet Sauvignon, Carignane, Chardonnay, Dolcetto, Grenache, Malbec, Malvasia, Merlot, Mondeuse, Mourvedre, Nebbiolo, Petit Verdot, Petite Sirah, Pinot noir, Sangiovese, Sauvignon blanc, Syrah, Viognier, Zinfandel
- No. of wineries: 60+

Santa Cruz Mountains AVA is an American Viticultural Area (AVA) centered on the Santa Cruz Mountains. Its territory spans three California counties, Santa Clara, Santa Cruz and San Mateo. It was established as the nation’s eighth, the state’s sixth and the counties' initial appellation on December 4, 1981 by the Bureau of Alcohol, Tobacco and Firearms (ATF), Treasury after reviewing the petition submitted by the Santa Cruz Mountains Vintners proposing a viticultural area in portions of San Mateo, Santa Clara, and Santa Cruz Counties to be named "Santa Cruz Mountains."

The appellation was among the first to be defined by its mountainous topography. Based on elevation, it largely follows the fog line along the coast, extending down to 800 feet (240 m) on the eastern slope toward San Francisco Bay, 400 feet (120 m) on the western slope to the Pacific Ocean and extending along the ridge crest line at 3,000 feet (910 m) elevation plus.
The mountainous terrain, the Pacific Ocean, and the San Francisco Bay have wide-ranging effects on the appellation, creating myriad microclimates in the region depending on the elevation of the land, location of the sloped mountainside vineyards, and the other terroir elements of fog, sun exposure, soil type and erosion.

== History ==
"Santa Cruz Mountains", was used to designate an area having a long history as a grape-growing region in California. The area has been recorded as the "Santa Cruz Mountains" since 1838. As early as 1867, when the first government surveyor laid section lines in the area, the vineyards of the region were noted. Moreover, numerous books and articles dealing with wine refer to the "Santa Cruz Mountains" as a specific grape-growing area. Testimony was also received which indicated that although the proposed area encompassed parts of three counties, the "Santa Cruz Mountains" constitutes a well-defined area forming a distinct geographical and phytogeographical unit.
The history of wine growing in the Santa Cruz Mountains goes back to the 1860s when George Jarvis first planted significant vineyards. By the 1870s there were 16 vintners in Santa Cruz County and by the late 1880s there were thirty-eight wineries. Santa Cruz Mountains wineries started to receive awards and gain international recognition. Ben Lomond Wine Co., operated by William Coope, and Dr. John Stewart won prizes at World’s Fairs in Paris in 1889, Chicago in 1893, and San Francisco in 1894.
In the 1880s, vine acreage increased fivefold in the Santa Cruz Mountains. Quality Santa Cruz Mountains wines came from Santa Clara and San Mateo counties as well. However, prohibition soon marked the end of California's international reputation as a quality wine district. Prohibition began in 1919, forbidding the “manufacture, sale, or transportation of intoxicating liquors” and lasted until December 5, 1933. Afterward, growers began replanting fine wine variety vineyards, but it was decades later that modern winemaking was adopted, enabling the Santa Cruz Mountains to regain its status as a national premier wine growing region. Many California's wine-growing pioneers were based here, including Paul Masson, Martin Ray, and Charles Le Franc. The appellation was the first in the U.S. to be defined by geophysical and climatic factors. While the Santa Cruz Mountains began as a well-kept secret, its wines increasingly became better-known and more widely recognized among wine enthusiasts and the general public.
In the 1960s and early 1970s, the quality of some California wines was outstanding but few took notice as the market favored French brands. At the legendary Judgement of Paris blind tasting event on 24 May 1976, celebrating the United States Bicentennial and judged by renown French oenophiles, California vintages in white and red wine categories ranked 1st besting acclaimed French wines. Also the 1971 Ridge Vineyards Monte Bello Cabernet from the Santa Cruz Mountains ranked 5th. The identical vintage ranked 3rd in an anniversary event at the San Francisco Wine Tasting of 1978 and ranked 1st in the Judgment of Paris 30th anniversary tastings on both sides of the Atlantic Ocean in 2006.

== Terroir ==
=== Topography ===
The region is bounded by the Santa Cruz Mountain Range, from the northern boundary of Half Moon Bay and Woodside to its southern side of Mount Madonna and Watsonville. The appellation encompasses some 480,000 acres (750 sq mi) extending through Santa Cruz, Santa Clara and San Mateo counties. The boundaries of the "Santa Cruz Mountains" viticultural area are based, in general, on contour lines and man-made features. Evidence was presented at the hearing that the contour lines varied to different levels to include an area exhibiting the same general geophysical characteristics, e.g. climate, soil, and topographic features. Portions of the boundaries of the viticultural area are marked by man-made features, e.g. Highways 280 and 84, and Cañada Road to the east. These roads were chosen because they delimit the particular geographical and climatic features of the area.

=== Climate ===
"Santa Cruz Mountains" is characterized by a climate which is greatly influenced in the western portion by the Pacific Ocean breezes and fog movements, and in the eastern portion by the moderating influences of the San Francisco Bay. These two influences tend to produce weather which is generally cool during the growing season. Temperatures in the slopes of the hillsides where most of the vineyards are located appear to vary from that at the lower elevations. This is caused by the marine influence coming off the Pacific Ocean which cools the mountains at night much more than the valley floor. The area is characterized by a growing season in excess of 300 days. This is air drainage due to cool air coming down the mountains forcing the warmer air upward, thereby lengthening the season in which the necessary conditions for grape-growing are present. Moreover, while the climate, in terms of temperature can be characterized as mild, the "Santa Cruz Mountains" has an average rainfall much greater than the surrounding areas. The USDA plant hardiness zone range is 9a to 10a.

=== Soil ===
The soils in the area were identified as Franciscan shale which is unique to this particular area south of San Francisco. The soil is basically residual material from the decomposition of bedrock and the soil types in the area differ depending on the type of underlying bedrock. Generally, these residual soils tend to be thin and stony, primarily shale, sandstone and clay, somewhat excessively drained naturally stressing vines and producing wines of uncommon concentration and longevity. They were characterized as impoverished. making it extremely difficult to grow grapes. This contrasts greatly with the soil of the surrounding area which is primarily alluvium and is more fertile.

== Wine regions ==
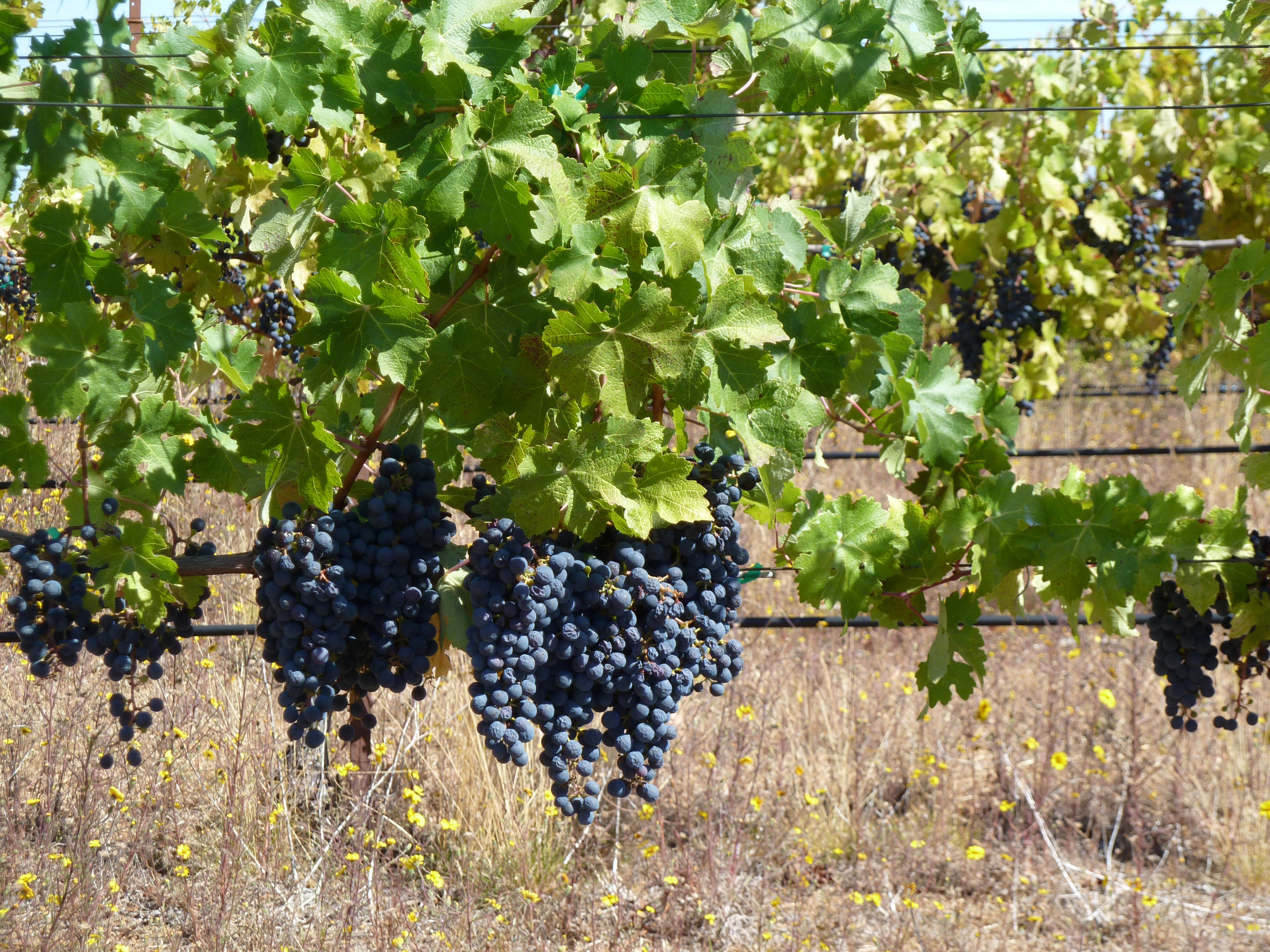
Ridge Vineyards Monte Bello Cabernet Sauvignon

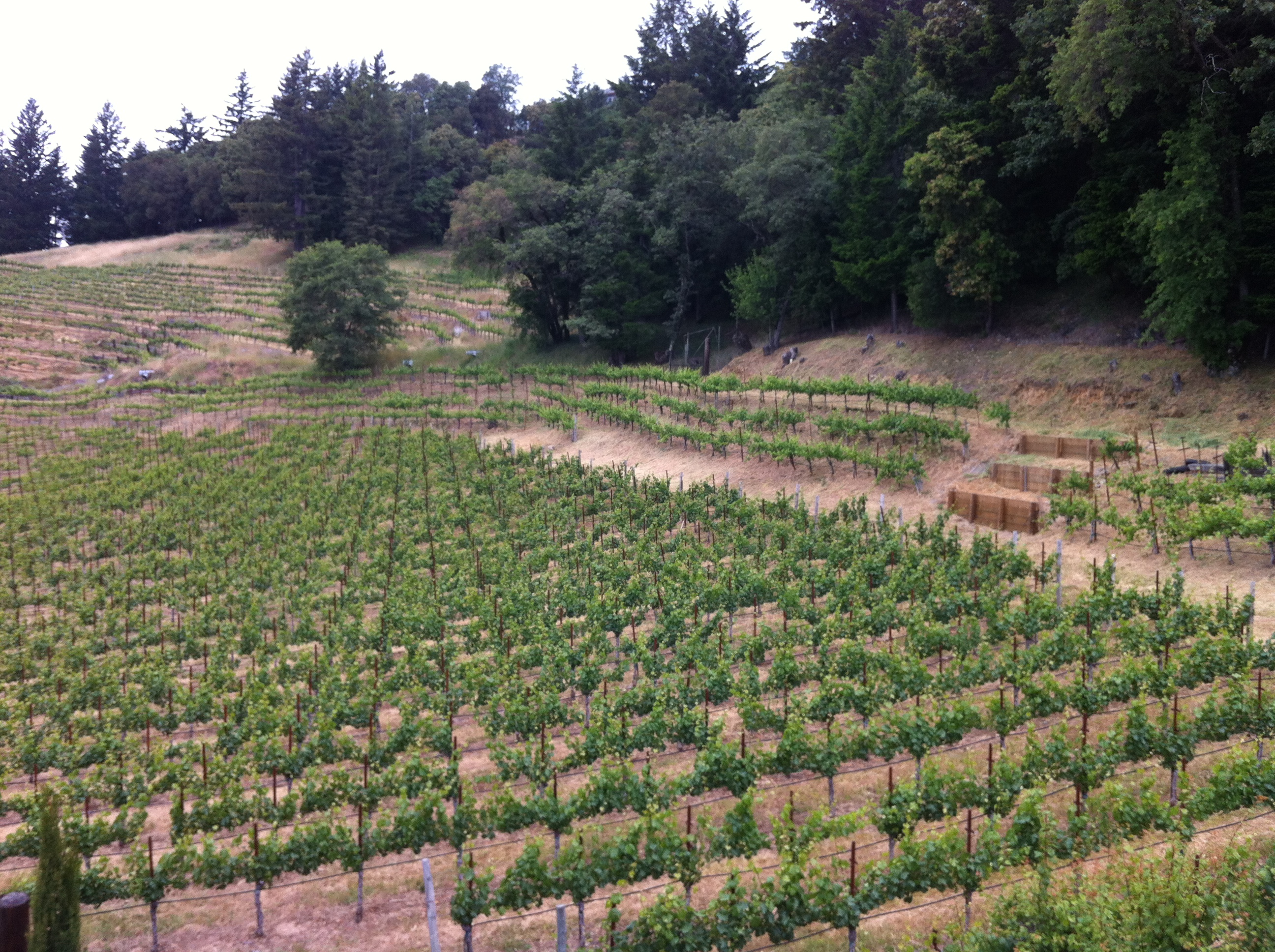
David Bruce vineyards in Santa Cruz Mountains

Santa Cruz Mountains is locally sub-divided, by the Viticulture Association of the Santa Cruz Mountains, into Skyline, Saratoga/Los Gatos, Summit, The Coastal Foothills, Ben Lomond Mountain, and Corralitos/Pleasant Valley. Only Ben Lomond Mountain is recognized as an established AVA.

== Vineyards and grape varieties ==
There are over 200 small vineyards cultivating about 1,500 acres (607 ha) of wine grape varieties, divided evenly 25% among Pinot noir, Cabernet Sauvignon, Chardonnay, and other varieties (most notably Merlot and Zinfandel). The region's vineyards and wineries actively support sustainable practices, including cover crops, erosion control, canopy management, solar, biodiesel. Several vineyards grow organically; presently four are certified organic by the CCOF and more are in the process of certification.

== Wines and wineries ==
Some of the oldest wineries in California are in this region. Two wineries from the Santa Cruz Mountain locale participated in the 1976 Judgment of Paris wine tasting with David Bruce Winery's 1973 Chardonnay placing 10th in the white category and the Ridge Vineyards' 1971 Monte Bello Cabernet Sauvignon placing 5th in the red wines. The identical Monte Bello vintage ranked 3rd in the anniversary event at the San Francisco Wine Tasting of 1978 and ranked 1st in the Judgment of Paris 30th anniversary tastings on both sides of the Atlantic Ocean in 2006.

Other notable wineries in the appellation are Big Basin Vineyards, Sante Arcangeli, Silver Mountain Vineyards, Eden Estates, Alfaro Family Vineyards, Armitage Wines, Mount Eden vineyards, Hallcrest Vineyards, Byington Vineyard, Bargetto Winery, Thomas Fogarty Winery, Kathryn Kennedy Winery, Mountain Winery, La Honda Winery, and Savannah-Chanelle Vineyards.
