= Colette Magny =

French singer-songwriter (1926–1997)

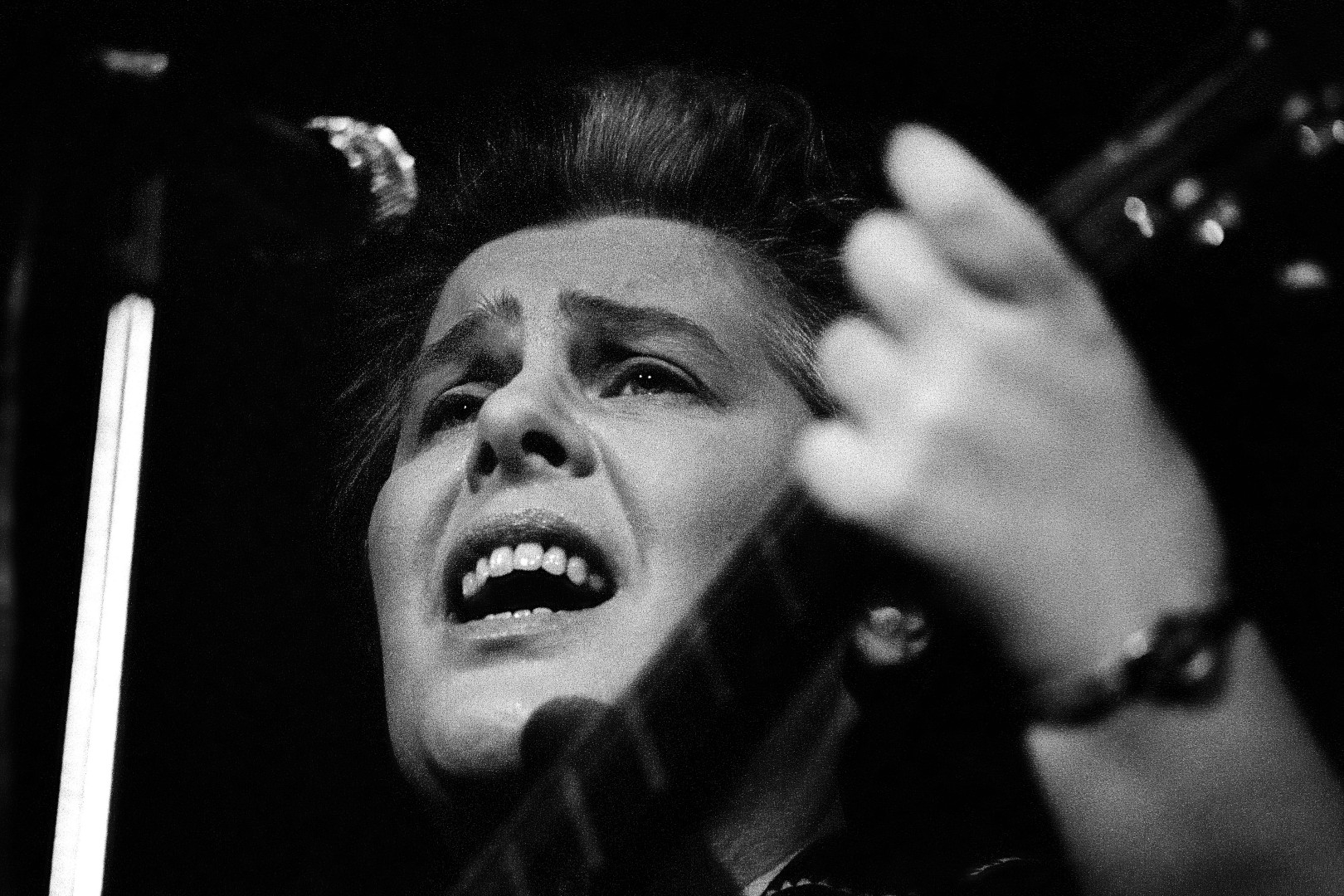
- Magny in 1972

Background information
- Born: 31 October 1926; Paris, France
- Died: 12 June 1997 (aged 70) Villefranche-de-Rouergue, France
- Genres: Blues, jazz, chanson, protest songs, avant-garde music, spoken word
- Occupations: Singer, songwriter
- Instrument: Guitar
- Years active: 1958–1990s
- Labels: CBS, Mouloudji, Le Chant du Monde

Colette Magny (31 October 1926 – 12 June 1997) was a French singer and songwriter. A charismatic performer who did not record until her thirties, her work encompassed blues, jazz, protest songs, experimental music and spoken word recordings.

== Life and career ==
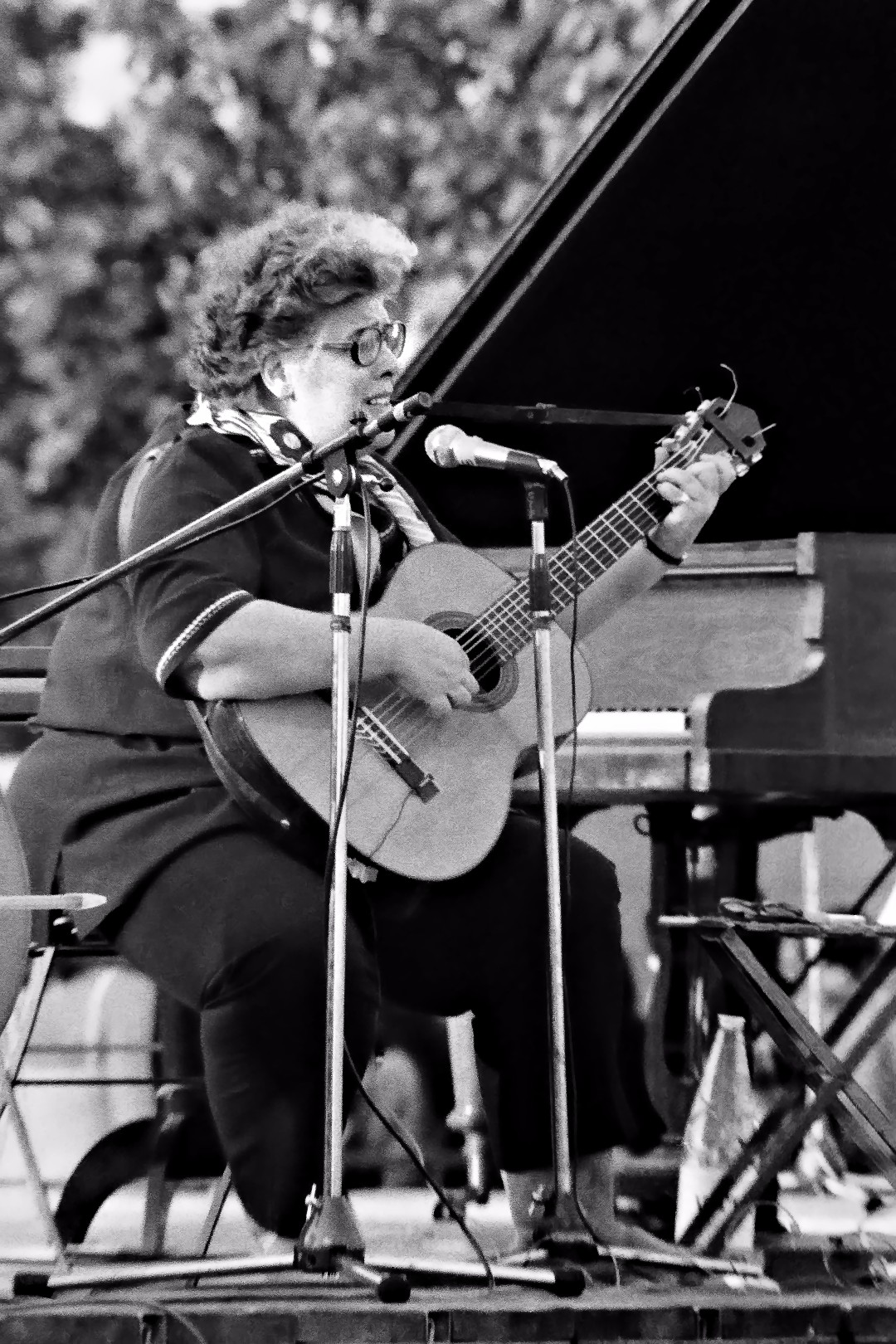
Colette Magny performing in 1975

She was born in Paris, and from 1948 worked as a secretary and translator for the Organisation for Economic Co-operation and Development (OECD). Fluent in English, she became a fan of American blues and jazz singers such as Bessie Smith and Ella Fitzgerald, and was taught guitar by jazz musician Claude Luter. She also started writing songs. Her mother took up acting in the 1950s, and Colette began singing her own songs and blues standards in Paris clubs. She made her first recordings in 1958, on an album by trumpeter and bandleader Gilles Thibaut, Des classiques du jazz.

After appearing at the Contrescarpe cabaret in 1962, she was discovered by the singer Mireille Hartuch, who featured her on her TV show Le Petit Conservatoire de la Chanson. She received rave reviews, and gave up her full-time job for a musical career. She signed with CBS Records, and her first single, the self-penned "Melocoton" ("Peach"), which featured Mickey Baker on guitar as did many of her later recordings, became a hit in France in 1963. Her first album, self-titled but sometimes known as Les Tuileries, also featured her musical treatments of poems by Victor Hugo, Rimbaud, Rilke and Louis Aragon, as well as blues classics including "Saint James Infirmary" and Bessie Smith's "Any Woman's Blues". Her second album, the experimental "Avec" poème (1966), released on the record label established by Marcel Mouloudji, contained both spoken and sung texts over electroacoustic music and musique concrète by the Surrealist-influenced composer André Almuró.

Magny became increasingly supportive of political activism. Her song "Le mal du vivre" was banned by ORTF, the state broadcasting network, and marked her out as France's first protest singer. Her recordings were issued by Le Chant du Monde. Her next album, also self-titled, featured her songs "Vietnam 67" and "Viva Cuba", together with one celebrating a strike of port workers, as well as further settings of poems and metaphysical texts. During the events and riots of May 68, she actively supported students and workers at sit-ins and through benefit concerts. She wrote the song "Les militants" for the protesters, and later also issued a spoken word album, Magny 68/69.

She produced three albums in the early 1970s – Feu et rythme (1970), which won the Grand Prix du Disque from the Académie Charles Cros; Répression (1972), which concerned censorship and was supportive of the Black Panther movement; and Transit (1975), which she recorded with free jazz performers including saxophonist Maurice Merle. Her 1977 album Visage-Village was recorded with the rock group Dharma and accordionist Lino Leonardi. According to writer Benoît Houzé, "throughout her experiments, Magny always kept an artistic generosity which clearly binds most of her songs, as 'avant-gardist' as they can be, to the tradition of French chanson populaire."

Her 1979 album Je Veux Chaanter was recorded with, and included songs written by, children with mental disabilities in the Institut médico-pédagogique at Fontenoy-le-Château, and was performed partly with home-made instruments. In 1980, she released two single-sided spoken word albums, one of poems by Antonin Artaud and the other of text by the Swiss artist Sylvie Duval. Magny moved to live near Aveyron in south-west France, and her recordings became more mellow in tone, her 1983 album Chansons pour Titine even including Cole Porter's "My Heart Belongs to Daddy". Her final album, Kevork (1989), included a song in praise of the turkey, a bird which, once released from domestication, can revert to its wild state.

Magny suffered from health problems including obesity and, in later years, a spinal disease that confined her to a bed or wheelchair. She died in 1997, aged 70.

== Biography ==
A biography by Sylvie Vadureau, Colette Magny, Citoyenne - Blues, was published in 2017.

== Discography ==
=== Albums ===
- Frappe ton coeur (Le Chant du Monde, 1963)
- Colette Magny (aka Les Tuileries, CBS, 1964)
- "Avec" Poème (Disques Mouloudji, 1966)
- Colette Magny (aka Vietnam 67, Le Chant du Monde, 1967)
- Magny 68/69 (Taï-Ki, 1969)
- Feu et Rythme (Le Chant du Monde, 1971)
- Répression (Le Chant du Monde, 1972)
- Transit (with Free Jazz Workshop), (Le Chant du Monde, 1975)
- Chili - Un peuple crève... (with Maxime Le Forestier and Mara Jerez), (Le Chant du Monde, 1975)
- Visage-Village (with Dharma and Lino Leonardi), (Le Chant du Monde, 1977)
- Je Veux Chaanter (with Les Enfants de l'I.M.P. de Fontenoy-le-Château), (Le Chant du Monde, 1979)
- Thanakan (single-sided album, Le Chant du Monde, 1981)
- Cahier d'une tortue (single-sided album, Le Chant du Monde, 1981)
- Chansons pour Titine (Le Chant du Monde, 1983)
- Kevork (Colette Magny Promotion, 1989)
- Inédits 91 (Colette Magny Promotion, 1991)
