= David Bruce Winery =

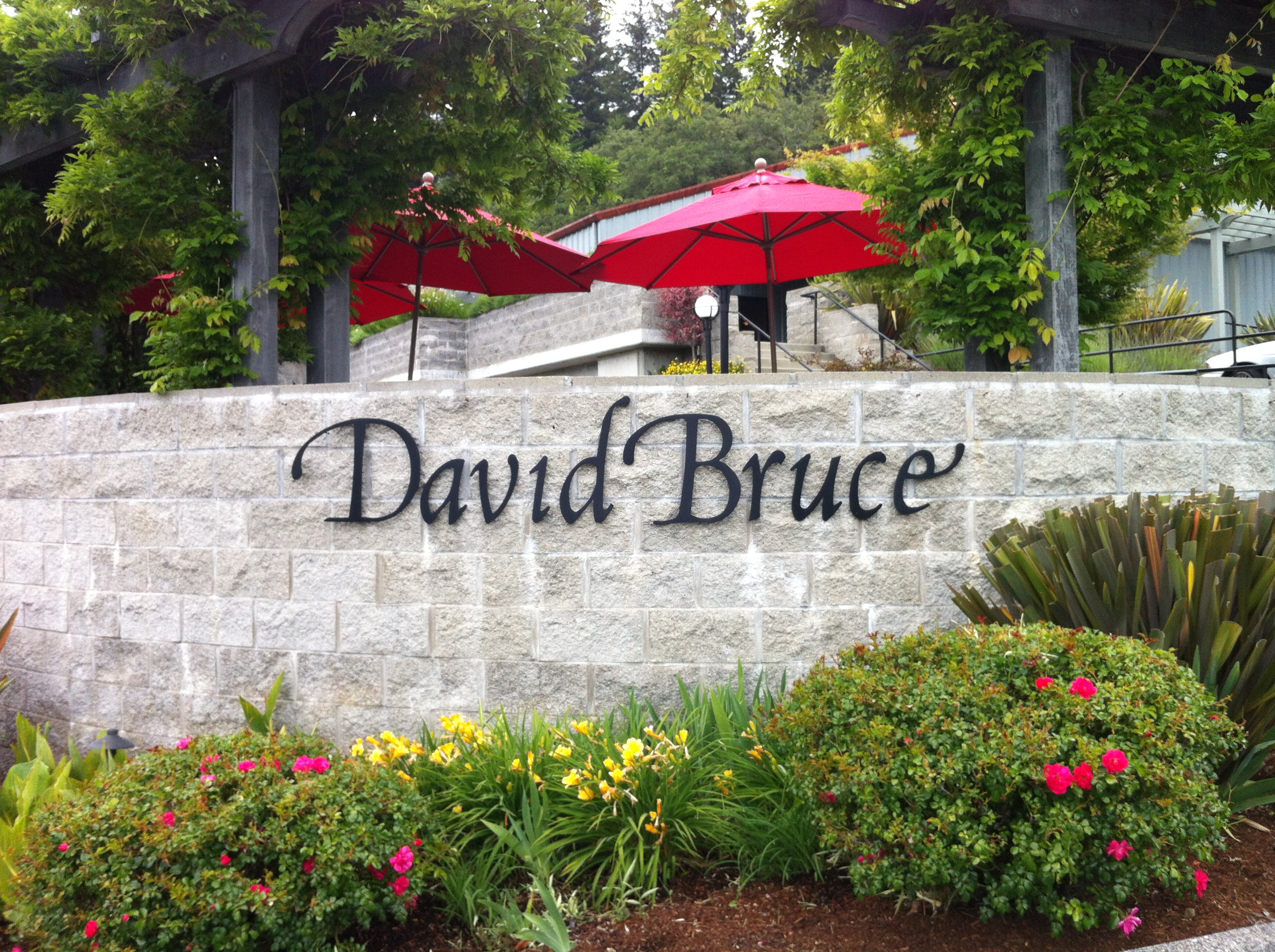
Exterior to David Bruce Winery in Los Gatos.

David Bruce Winery is a California winery located at about 2,200 feet (670 m) elevation in the Santa Cruz Mountains AVA above Silicon Valley in Northern California. It was established by dermatologist David Bruce, M.D., in 1964 about a mile away from the Martin Ray Vineyard that often appears on vineyard designated wines from David Bruce. The vineyard achieved international visibility when one of the winery's Chardonnays was featured in the 1976 wine tasting competition that became known as the Judgment of Paris. Today the winery specializes in Pinot noir.

== History ==
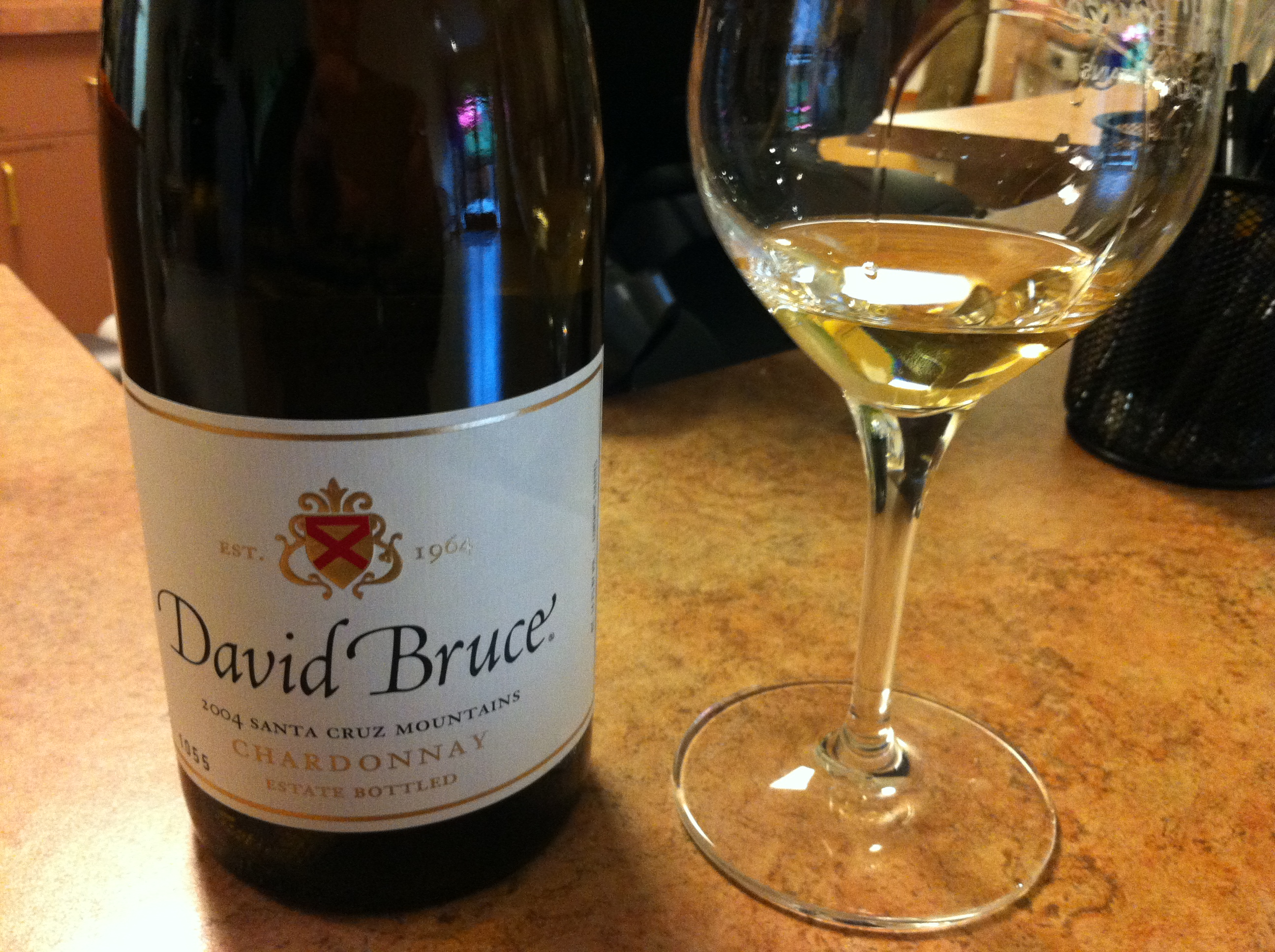
A Chardonnay from David Bruce.

David Bruce Winery was founded during the revival of the Santa Cruz Mountain wine industry between the 1950s and 1970s. Bruce selected his vineyard site because of its proximity to Martin Ray and with the belief that the high elevation and mesoclimate of the area would be well suited for growing the Burgundian wine grapes of Pinot noir and Chardonnay.

In 1975, British wine merchant Steven Spurrier selected 1973 bottling of David Bruce Chardonnay for his 1976 Paris tasting that would put Californian Chardonnays and Cabernet Sauvignon against their French counterparts from Burgundy and Bordeaux, respectively. While the overall Chardonnay category was won by a Californian wine from Napa Valley, the 1973 David Bruce Chardonnay placed last of the 10 Chardonnays being tasted.
