= Byington Vineyard =

Byington Vineyard & Winery is a 95-acre (0.38 km^{2}) vineyard and winery in the Santa Cruz Mountains AVA above Silicon Valley in California.

== History ==
In 1958, Bill and Mary Byington, purchased 95 acres (0.38 km^{2}) surrounded by redwood forests as a family retreat. In the early 1970s, a well-known Santa Cruz Mountains winemaker approached the family, wanting to lease a portion of their land for vineyards. Almost 20 years after leaving his family farm in Idaho, Bill planted eight acres (32,000 m^{2}) of Pinot Noir on the southernmost tip of the rugged Santa Cruz Mountains terrain. Byington Vineyard & Winery was established with its vintage 1987 release.
