= Charles Rosen (scientist) =

Canadian AI researcher (1917–2002)

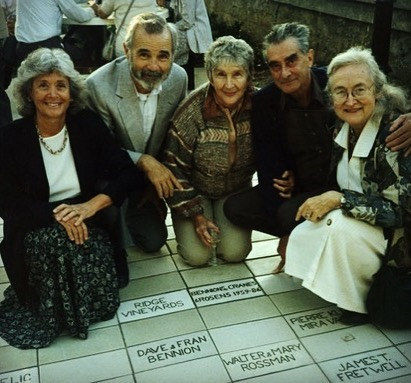
- Rosen (center-right)
- Born: December 7, 1917
- Died: December 8, 2002 (aged 85)
- Education: Cooper Union; McGill University
- Known for: Shakey the robot
- Scientific career
- Workplaces: General Electric Research Laboratory SRI International's Artificial Intelligence Center Ridge Vineyards

Charles Rosen (December 7, 1917 – December 8, 2002) was a pioneer in artificial intelligence and founder of SRI International's Artificial Intelligence Center. He led the project that led to the development of Shakey the Robot, "who" now resides in a glass case at the Computer History Museum, in Mountain View, California.

== Early life and education ==
Raised in Montreal, Rosen became a student at Cooper Union and received his bachelor's degree in electrical engineering in 1940; he returned to Montreal to study at McGill University, where he received his M. Eng. (in communications) in 1950.

== Career ==
While working at the General Electric Research Laboratory, in 1953 Rosen co-authored one of the first textbooks on transistor circuits. In 1956, Rosen received a Ph.D. in electrical engineering from Syracuse University (with a minor in solid state physics).

In 1957, Rosen joined the Stanford Research Institute, where he did much of his artificial intelligence work.

In 1959, Rosen co-founded Ridge Vineyards with SRI colleagues Hewitt Crane and David Bennion. Under their ownership, Ridge would go on to place fifth in the Judgment of Paris wine tasting.

In 1978, Rosen co-founded Machine Intelligence Corporation (MIC) with colleagues from SRI and elsewhere. He served as its first CEO. MIC developed the first commercially available industrial machine vision system, the VS-100, in his garage. MIC later spun out Symantec Corporation in 1982. He was founding Fellow of the Association for the Advancement of Artificial Intelligence in 1990.
