= Charlie Rosen (engineer) =

American metallurgical engineer

Charles D. Rosen (born January 16, 1937, in Long Beach, New York; died February 22, 2007, in Costa Mesa, California) was an American metallurgical engineer and friction stir welding expert.

== Life and career ==
Charlie Rosen graduated as a metallurgical engineer at Rensselaer Polytechnic Institute in Troy, New York, and obtained an MBA from the University of Southern California. He was the Project Manager in charge of failure testing and analysis for the Space Shuttle Program at Rockwell International. There he specialised in the use of electron microscopy for failure analysis. He became “Engineer of the Year” in 1995 for the Space Systems Division of Rockwell International. He filed and was granted five U.S. Patents for friction stir welding processes. During his retirement he was a volunteer of the Huntington Beach Police Department's RSVP program.

Charlie was married to Suzanne, née Myers, with daughter Gail Rosen and two sons Jeffrey and Alan Rosen.

== Patents ==
- FSW tool design for thick weld joints. US Patent No 6227430
- Friction stir welding interlocking joint design and method. US Patent No 6045027
- Friction stir welding process to repair voids in aluminum alloys. US Patent No 5971252
- Friction stir welding total penetration technique. US Patent No 5611479
- Manual keyhole plasma arc welding system. US Patent No 5045667
