= André Almuró =

Background information
- Birth name: André Almuró
- Born: June 3, 1927; Paris, France
- Died: June 17, 2009 (aged 82); Paris, France
- Genres: Musique concrète, electroacoustic, acousmatic, classical, electronic
- Occupation(s): Radio producer, composer, educator, cinematographer

André Almuró (3 June 1927 – 17 June 2009) was a French radio producer, composer, and film director.

== Early years ==
Almuró was born in Paris in 1927 and studied piano from an early age. In 1946, influenced by Surrealism and René Daumal, he founded a literary journal titled Les Cahiers Sensationnistes.

In 1947, he joined Pierre Schaeffer's Club d'Essai on RTF (Radio Télévision Française) as a radio producer. During the 1950s, he produced many radio plays based on French writers, with a preference for Surrealists like André Breton, René Char, Jean Cocteau, Antonin Artaud, Julien Gracq.

== 1950s ==
Almuró used increasingly difficult and provocative texts for his radio plays, like Jean Genet's homoerotic poem Le Condamné à Mort, for which Almuró created electroacoustic music in 1952, or Antonin Artaud's Van Gogh, Le Suicidé De La Société in 1958, a text written 1947, the same year as Pour en Finir avec le Jugement de Dieu [To Have Done With the Judgment of God], written for radio but withheld from broadcast by directors in 1948.

In 1957, his meeting with 15-year-old Pierre Clémenti influenced Almuró to start recording Clémenti's poetry readings and make him his assistant. Clémenti, born 1942, later became actor and film director, collaborating with Almuró on several films.

When Schaeffer founded his Groupe de Recherches Musicales in 1958, Almuró joined as a member for several years, but soon launched his own, independent recording studio in the early 1960s. Here he produced incidental music and collaborations with other artists, like singer Colette Magny, with whom he published two LPs, Avec, 1966 and Bura Bura, 1967.

== Teacher and filmmaker ==
In 1973, Almuró became a teacher at Paris' Sorbonne University (UFR d’Arts Plastiques, Faculté Paris I Sorbonne). Other teachers included writer Dominique Noguez and contemporary artist Michel Journiac. Students included film maker Stéphane Marti and musicians Jean-Luc Guionnet and Eric Cordier.

In 1976, he created a live performance titled Partition with French contemporary artist Ange Leccia, and founded the Son-Images-Corps performance group with students. His opera Close Up was premiered in Poitiers, France.

In 1978 he directed his first film, Cortège, with music by electroacoustic music composer and Almuró student, Philippe Jubard. Almuró's cinema is overtly homoerotic and has been described as "un cinéma d’orgasme et de désir entre deux hommes" (pleasure and desire between two men) by French film director Christian Lebrat. From this date, Almuró directed more than 30 films, including Alliage, 1985, Point Vélique, 1986 and Corps Intérieur, 1988.

== Selected works ==
=== Radio plays ===
- 1952 Le Condamné à Mort, by Jean Genet
- 1955 Nadja Etoilée, after André Breton with Maria Casarès and Roger Blin
- 1958 Van Gogh, Le Suicidé De La Société, by Antonin Artaud

=== Electroacoustic music ===
- 1958 Croquis aux Percussions
- 1958 Erostrauss
- 1966 Phonolithe
- 1966 Poésie de Cruauté LP (EMZ 13514)
- 1966 Avec, LP with Colette Magny
- 1967 Bura Bura, LP with Colette Magny
- 1967 Va-Et-Vient
- 1968 Mantra 107
- 1969 Prolégosphère
- 1978 Terrae Incognitae (oratorio)
- 1979 Boomerang, Prelude
- 1991 Le Troisième Oeil

=== Films ===
- 1958 Les Enfants de Misère, with Pierre Clémenti
- 1959 Le Deuxième Monde, with Pierre Clémenti
- 1960 Poèmes, with Pierre Clémenti
- 1973 Pièce de Musique, with Pierre Clémenti
- 1978 Cortège, music by Philippe Jubard
- 1985 Alliage
- 1986 Point Vélique
- 1987 L'inopiné
- 1988 Corps intérieur
- 1989 Le Troisième Oeil
- 1990 Clones, with Yves Pélissier
- 1991 Continuum, with Denis Le Rue
- 1992 Rumeur, with Jean-Luc Guionnet
- 1994 Littérale, with Jean-Luc Guionnet
- 1996 Tropes, with Jean-Luc Guionnet
- 1998 Entéléchie
- 2002 Chaos

=== Books ===
- 2002 L'Oeil Pinéal : Pour Une Cinégraphie, Éd. Paris Expérimental
