= La Honda Winery =

Urban winery in California, US

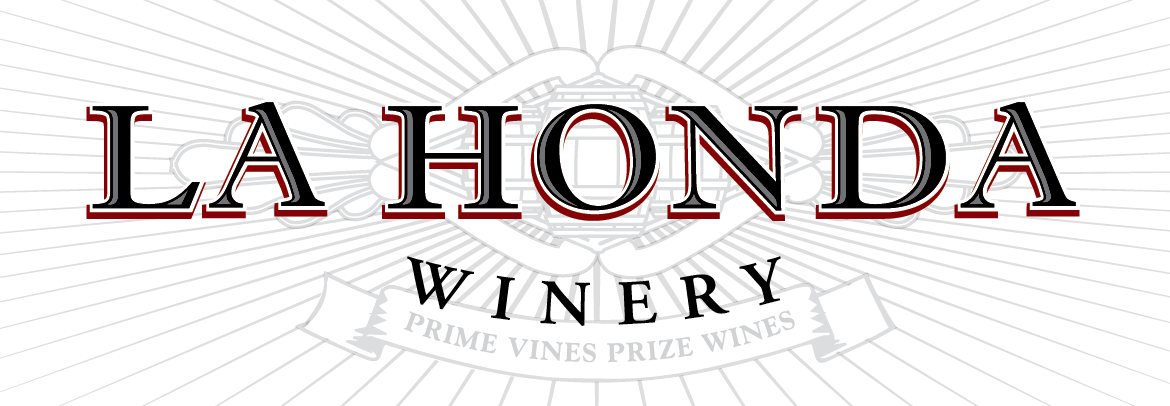

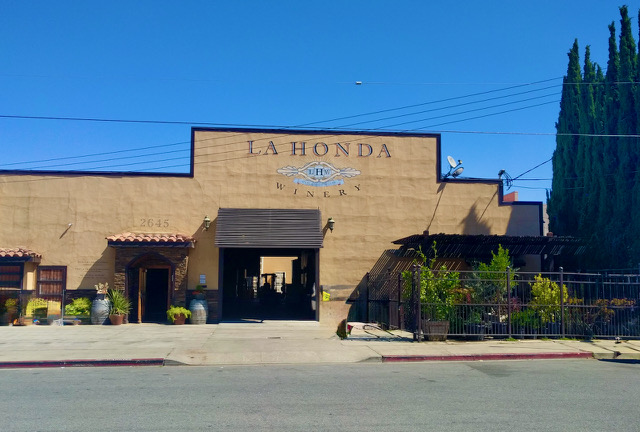
- Location: 2645 Fair Oaks Ave, Redwood City, California, United States
- Coordinates: 37.4817°N 122.2092°W
- Wine region: San Francisco Peninsula
- Appellation: Santa Cruz Mountains
- Other labels: Merry Pranksters
- Founded: 1999
- Key people: Andrew Vingielllo (winemaker); Thayer Dunwoody (vineyard manager); Lise Sutherland (event director); David Page (owner)
- Area cultivated: San Francisco Bay Area
- Cases/yr: 4,000
- Varietals: Sauvignon Blanc, Chardonnay, Pinot Noir, Merlot, Syrah, Zinfandel, Cabernet Sauvignon, Sangiovese
- Other attractions: Private and public events
- Distribution: Regional retailers and restaurants, wine club, events
- Tasting: Monthly public tastings, private events
- Website: www.lahondawinery.com

La Honda Winery is an urban winery in Redwood City, California. The winery produces wine from fruit grown in the 153 residential vineyards it manages locally as a response to Silicon Valley's high land prices. The winery operates a public tasting room.

== History ==
La Honda was founded in 1999 by vineyard manager Ken Wornick and takes its name from the site of its very first estate vineyard, on partner Don Modica's ranch in the mountains of La Honda. They opened La Honda's tasting room and production facility in 2007.

The winery was acquired by David Page and expanded vineyards under management to 153, located between Woodside and Los Gatos on San Francisco Bay's Peninsula within the Santa Clara Valley AVA.

In 2021, the winery was certified "Climate Neutral" and launched a second label, 'Merry Pranksters', as a cultural tribute to Ken Kesey and his band of followers, called Merry Pranksters, who were based in La Honda in the 1960's.

== See also ==
- Santa Clara Valley AVA
- California wine
