= Ridge Vineyards =

Northern California winery

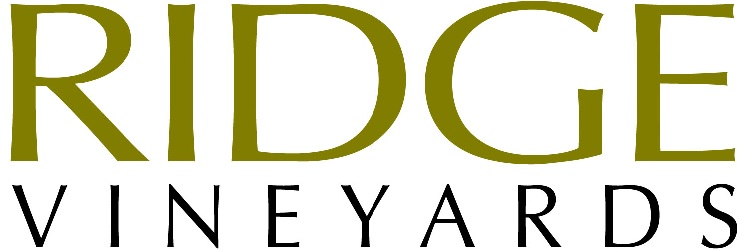
- Location: Cupertino, California, United States
- Coordinates: 37°18′18″N 122°07′46″W
- Appellation: Santa Cruz Mountains
- First vintage: 1962
- Key people: David R. Bennion (Founder); Paul Draper (Chairman of the Board); Mark Vernon (CEO); David Amadia (President); John Olney (COO & Head Winemaker); Michael Torino (VP of Wholesale Sales); Ryan Moore (VP of Consumer Sales)
- Parent company: Otsuka Pharmaceutical
- Known for: Monte Bello Cabernet Sauvignon
- Varietals: Cabernet Sauvignon, Chardonnay, Petite Sirah, Syrah, Zinfandel, Merlot, Grenache, Syrah, Carignane
- Distribution: International
- Tasting: Open to public on weekends
- Website: www.ridgewine.com

Ridge Vineyards is a California winery specializing in Cabernet Sauvignon, Zinfandel, and Chardonnay wines. Ridge Vineyards operates two winery locations in northern California. The original facilities are located at an elevation of 2,300 feet (700 metres) on Monte Bello Ridge in unincorporated Santa Clara County in the Santa Cruz Mountains AVA, south of Los Altos, California and west of Cupertino, California. The other Ridge winery facilities are at Lytton Springs in the Dry Creek Valley AVA of Sonoma County. Ridge Vineyard's 1971 Monte Bello Cabernet Sauvignon gained prominence for its fifth-place finish in the 1976 "Judgment of Paris" wine tasting.

== History ==
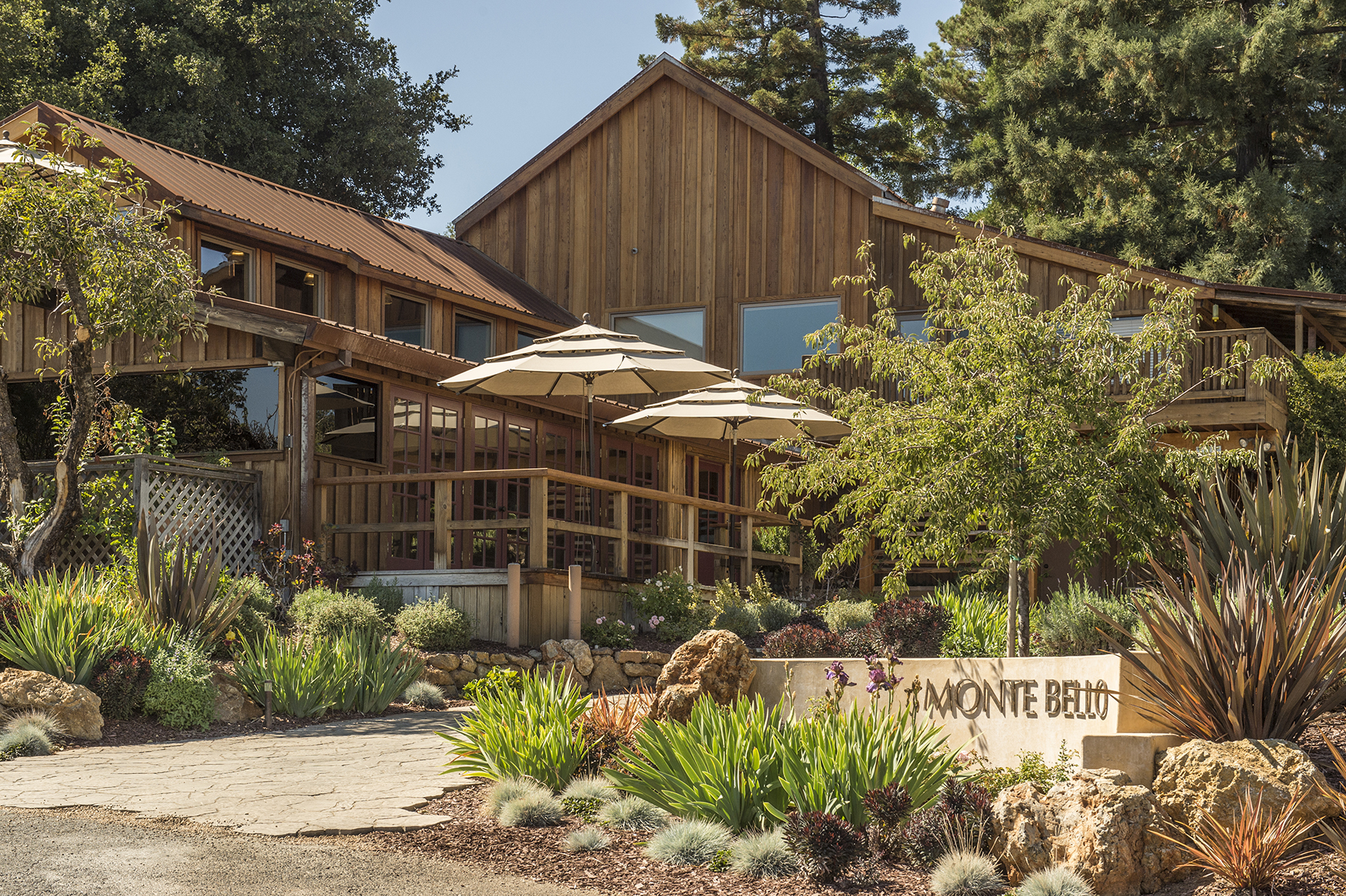
Ridge Vineyards, Monte Bello

Although Ridge Vineyards was founded in the early 1960s, wine production at the Monte Bello site dates back to the 19th century. Grapevines were first planted on Monte Bello Ridge by Osea Perrone, a doctor and prominent member of the northern California Italian immigrant community, in 1885. The first Monte Bello wine was produced in 1892. Following Prohibition, the Monte Bello vineyard passed through several owners, including amateur winemakers until it was purchased in 1959 by David Bennion, Charles Rosen, Hewitt Crane, and Howard Zeidler, all engineers at nearby Stanford Research Institute. Ridge Vineyards was bonded and produced its first commercial wine, a Monte Bello Cabernet Sauvignon, in 1962.

According to a 1987 New York Times article, Ridge Vineyards was acquired by a Japanese company: "The new owner is Otsuka U.S., a subsidiary of the Otsuka Pharmaceutical Co Ltd, a producer of nutritional drinks and other pharmaceutical products. Otsuka operates an experimental wine-making center near Fuji, in Japan."

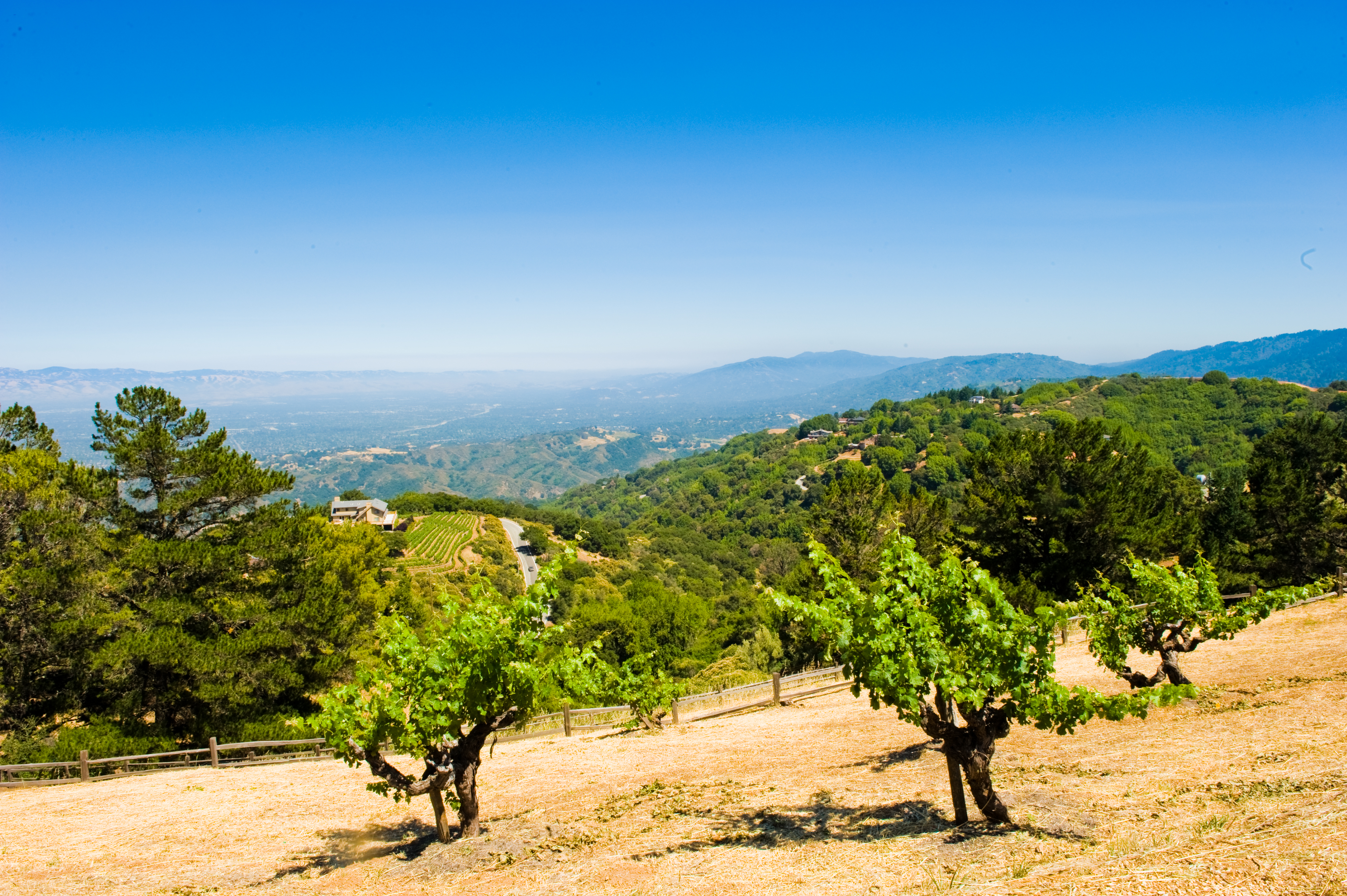
View from Ridge Vineyards on Monte Bello Ridge, Santa Cruz Mountains

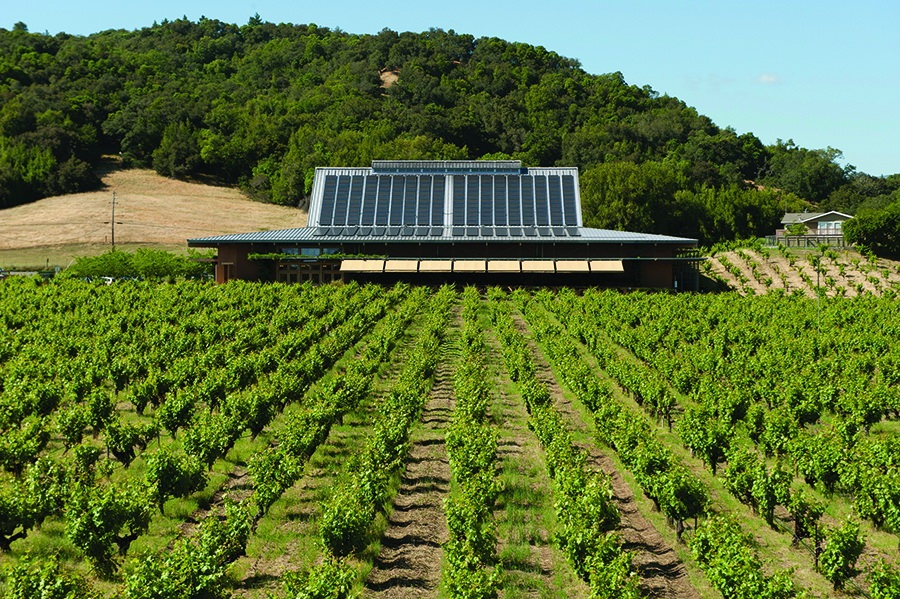
Ridge–Lytton Springs Vineyard

The international reputation of the Monte Bello wine produced by Ridge Vineyards was established when it achieved fifth place in the "Judgment of Paris", against nine other French and California wines. Monte Bello Cabernet Sauvignon was acclaimed in subsequent competitions, including The Judgment of Paris 30th Anniversary, the 30th anniversary retesting of the same red wines evaluated in the 1976 Paris wine competition. In this blind tasting, held both in the United States and in the United Kingdom, judges in both countries ranked Ridge Monte Bello number one among all the wines judged.

Ridge Vineyards produced its first Zinfandel in 1964. Beginning in 1966, the winery began sourcing some grapes for its Geyserville Zinfandel and other wines from vineyards in Sonoma County. In 1991, Ridge Vineyards purchased the Lytton Springs vineyard in the Dry Creek Valley AVA. The winery produces wine at both the Monte Bello and Lytton Springs locations, and operates tasting rooms open to the public at both.

== Winemakers ==
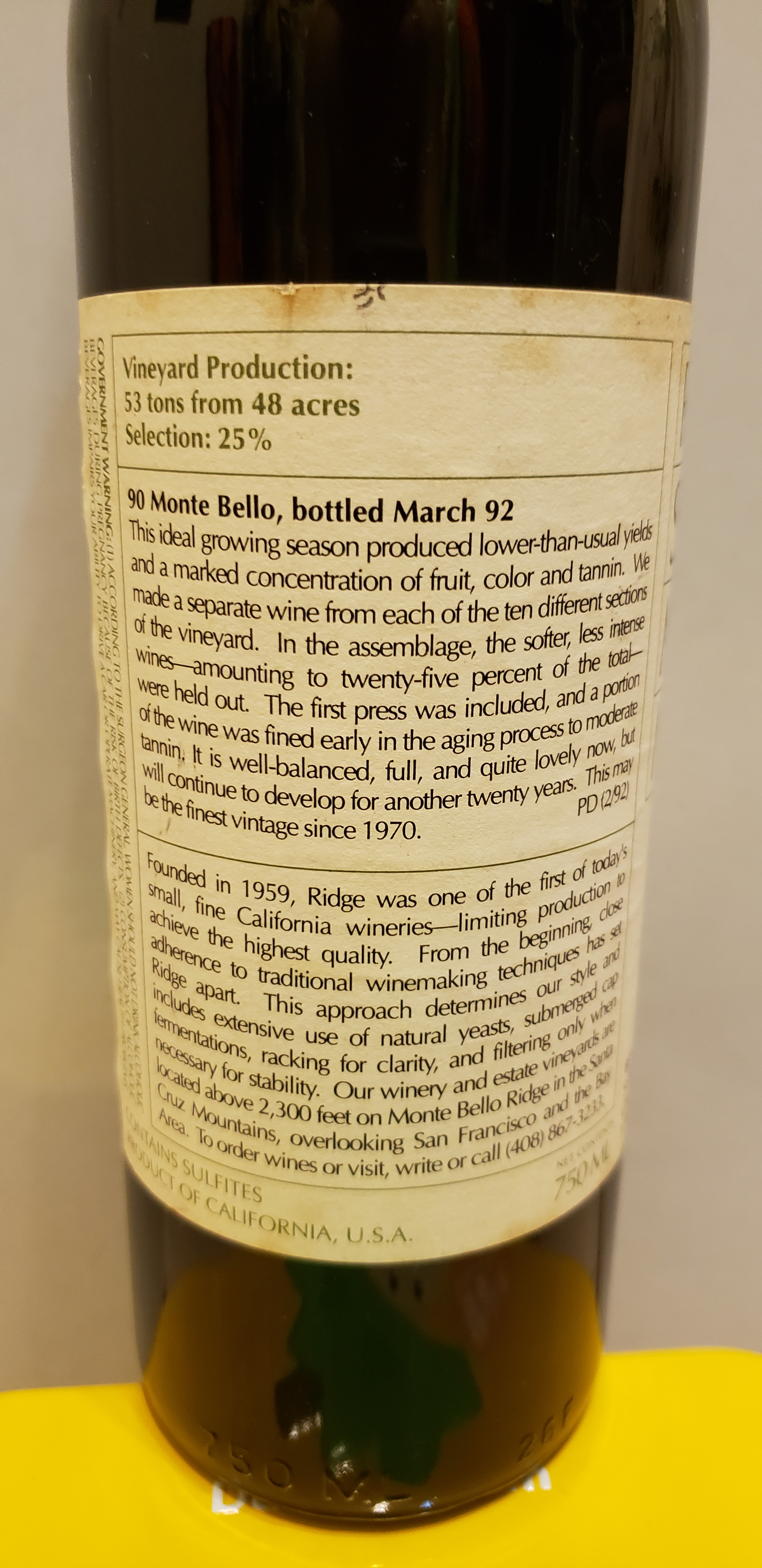
Back label of 1990 Monte Bello

=== David Bennion ===
In 1959, David Bennion purchased the 80 acre winery and vineyard above Cupertino in the Santa Cruz Mountains. That same year, he produced his very first wine, a Cabernet Sauvignon from the estate. Excited by the quality of the early wines, the partners decided to re-bond the winery in time for the 1962 vintage, calling their endeavor Ridge Vineyards.

By focusing on single-vineyard Zinfandels—Sonoma, Santa Cruz, Lodi, and Paso Robles—Bennion showed that Zinfandel can express terroir. He would go on to make single-vineyard wines from many other varieties including: Chardonnay, Pinot Noir, Ruby Cabernet, Carignan, and Pinot Blanc.

His winemaking style championed minimal intervention. A major component of this philosophy was to make use of the natural yeasts on the grapes. To this end, only a small amount of Sulfur would be used during the winemaking process. This process would only kill off the wild yeasts but allow the wine yeasts to survive on the grapes.

In 1967 Dave Bennion left SRI completely, to become the first president and winemaker of Ridge. Bennion served as winemaker at Ridge until 1970, when he hired Paul Draper to oversee winemaking operations. After hiring Draper, Bennion continued to serve as the President of Ridge until 1984.

=== Paul Draper ===
Ridge had been under the direction of winemaker Paul Draper since 1971. He was hired by David Bennion and emphasized natural, ecologically sustainable farming and fermentation. Draper is known for drying his own oak staves for use in barrels, which may be a component of the dusty "Draper Perfume" that is characteristic of Ridge wines. on 1 July 2016, Draper retired as CEO and Head Winemaker of the company, but remains chairman of the board. He produced 47 vintages for Ridge.

== Wines ==
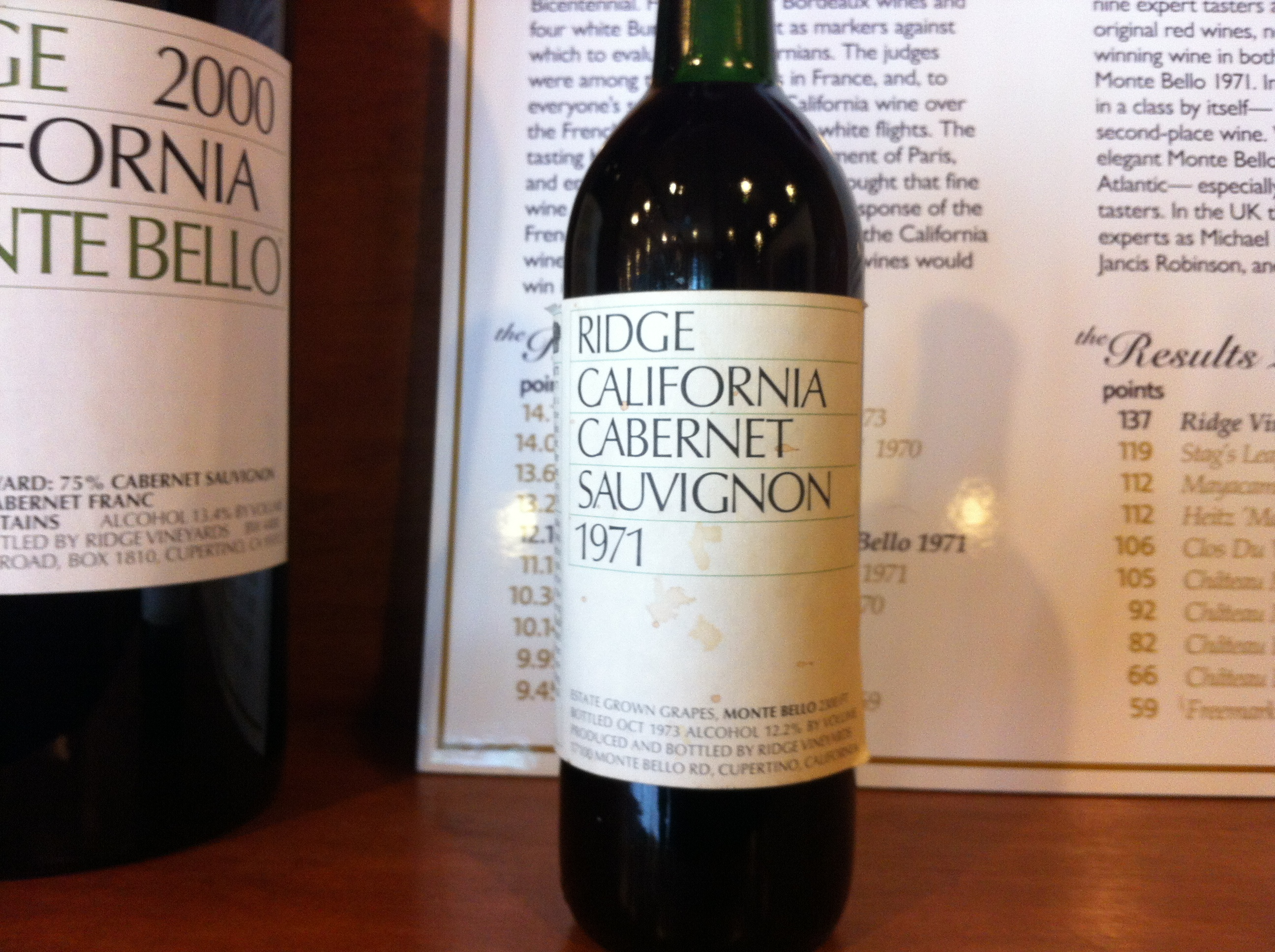
A bottle of 1971 Monte Bello Cabernet Sauvignon that was entered into the 1976 Judgement of Paris wine tasting.

Ridge focuses on single-estate wines, where grapes for each label are sourced from a single vineyard. The signature wine of Ridge is its Monte Bello, a field blend of Cabernet Sauvignon mixed with varying percentages of other grapes grown in the same location, usually including Merlot, Petit Verdot, and occasionally Cabernet Franc.

Ridge's Zinfandels (or mostly-Zinfandel field blends) constitute the bulk of the winery's production. Using grapes from selected sites from all over the state and bottling them each under their own label, Ridge Zinfandels emphasize the particular characteristics of each growing site and may show different aging characteristics than do other Zinfandels. Among the best known of the Ridge Zinfandels or Zinfandel-blends are those from Geyserville, York Creek, and Lytton Springs.

== Recognition ==
- Monte Bello wine by Ridge Vineyards achieved fifth place in the "Judgment of Paris", against nine other French and California wines in 1976.
- In 2013, Decanter Magazine named Ridge Vineyards as one of the top producers of Chardonnay and Cabernet Sauvignon in California.
- On 25 June 2014, The Daily Meal named among the best wineries in America. Ridge was named as one of the best producers of Cabernet Sauvignon and Chardonnay in 2013 California Vintage.
- On 25 June 2016, The Daily Meal again named Ridge Vineyards as one of the best wineries in America.
- New York Times’ wine critic Eric Asimov described Monte Bello as the America’s greatest Cabernet Sauvignon.
- In the 30 September 2016 Issue of Wine Spectator of The Outsider, wine critic James Laube wrote an article on Paul Draper's history with Ridge Vineyards. He noted “Ridge’s wines today are better than ever is a tribute to him (Paul) and his successors."
- On the evening of 18 October 2016, East Bench Zinfandel of Ridge Vineyards was selected to be served at the last state dinner of the Obama administration at the White House.

== See also ==
- California wine
