= David R. Bennion =

American winemaker

David Ralph Bennion
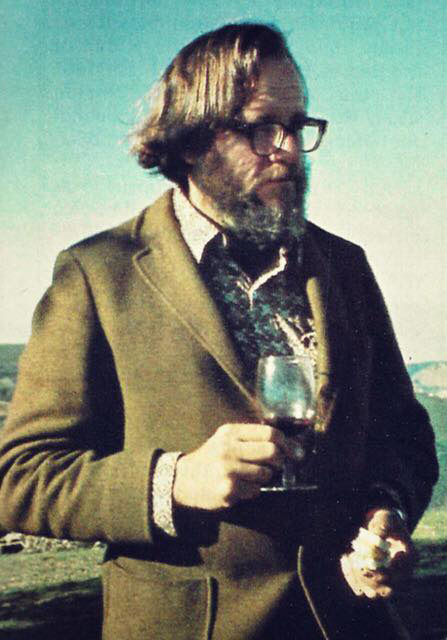
- Born: February 13, 1929; Salt Lake City, Utah
- Died: March 28, 1988 (aged 59); San Francisco, California
- Education: Stanford University
- Occupations: Winemaker; Engineer
- Known for: Pioneering Single-Vineyard Zinfandels
- Spouse: Frances Bennion
- Children: 3
- Website: http://drbenniontrustfund.org

David Ralph Bennion (1929–1988) was a leading California winemaker who was the founder and winemaker at Ridge Vineyards in California from 1959 to 1969. From an early period, Bennion labeled Ridge Vineyards wines by vineyard, district and appellation, a first for California Zinfandel and a practice later followed by nearly every winery in the state. Ridge's flagship wine, Monte Bello is considered one of the great wines of the world.

== Early life ==
Bennion was born in Utah, on his family's farm on February 12, 1929. In the late 1940s he moved to California, where he enrolled at Stanford University. While at Stanford, he met Frances Lusk, whom he married in 1953.

== Career at SRI ==
Bennion started his career at Stanford Research Institute (SRI) where he specialized in Magnetic Circuits. He was instrumental in designing the circuitry for Shakey the Robot, which has the distinction of being the first robot to reason about its own actions.

== Founding of Ridge Vineyards ==
In 1959, Bennion, Hewitt Crane, Charles Rosen and Howard Zeidler purchased an 80-acre winery and vineyard above Cupertino in the Santa Cruz Mountains. That same year, he produced his very first wine, a Cabernet Sauvignon from the vineyard. Excited by the quality of the early wines, the partners decided to re-bond the winery in time for the 1962 vintage, calling their endeavor Ridge Vineyards.

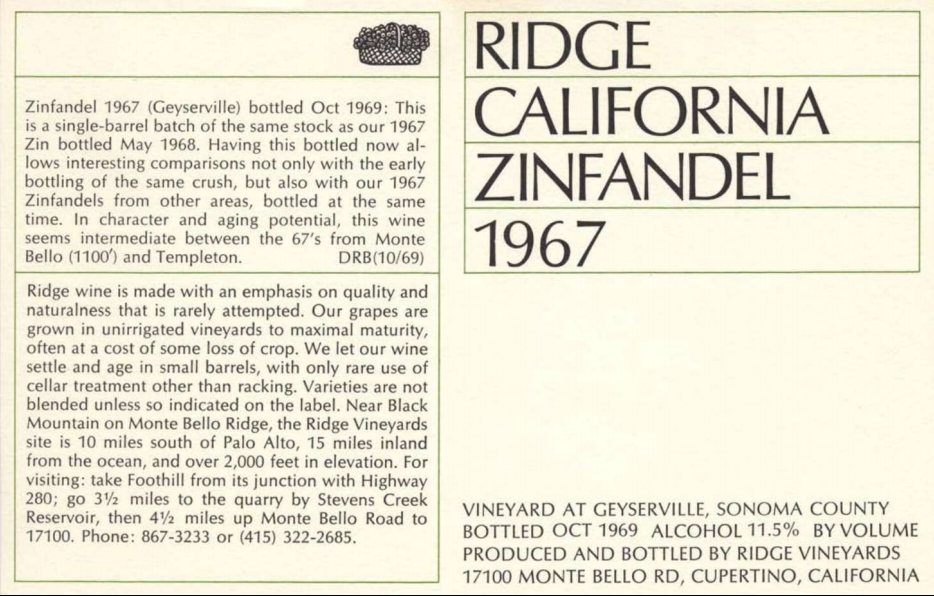
A label from a Ridge Zinfandel bearing David Bennion's tasting notes and initials.

In 1964, he produced the first Ridge Zinfandel, from a small nineteenth-century vineyard on the nearby Picchetti ranch. This was followed in 1966 by the first Geyserville Zinfandel.

By focusing on single-vineyard Zinfandels—Sonoma, Santa Cruz, Lodi, Paso Robles—Bennion showed that Zinfandel can express terroir. He would go on to make single-vineyard wines from many other varieties including: Chardonnay, Ruby Cabernet, Riesling and Cabernet Franc.

Bennion hired a San Francisco artist to design a unique label for his wines. It featured the use of Optima font and featured specifics that were nearly unheard of in California winemaking, such as the vineyard, grape composition, and exact alcohol by volume of the finished wine. Each bottling featured winemaking notes, detailing the weather, harvest conditions and bottling date.

His winemaking style championed minimal intervention. A major component of this philosophy was to make use of the natural yeasts on the grapes. To this end, only a small amount of Sulfur Dioxide would be used during the winemaking process. This would only kill off the unwanted wild yeasts but allow the wine yeasts to survive on the grapes. For the fermentation process, Bennion used a system of wooden lattices to keep the cap submerged in the must. This technique, which was used widely in France and elsewhere in Europe in the 19th century, proved extremely successful and would later be adopted by many California wineries.

In 1967, Dave Bennion left SRI completely, to become the first president and winemaker of Ridge. Bennion served as winemaker at Ridge until 1969, when he hired Paul Draper to oversee winemaking operations. After hiring Draper, Bennion continued to serve as the President of Ridge until 1984.

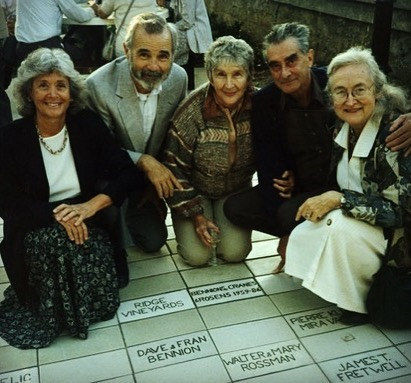
Ridge Founders, Sue and Hew Crane (Left), Blanche and Charles Rosen (center) and Frances Bennion (Right)

== Legacy ==
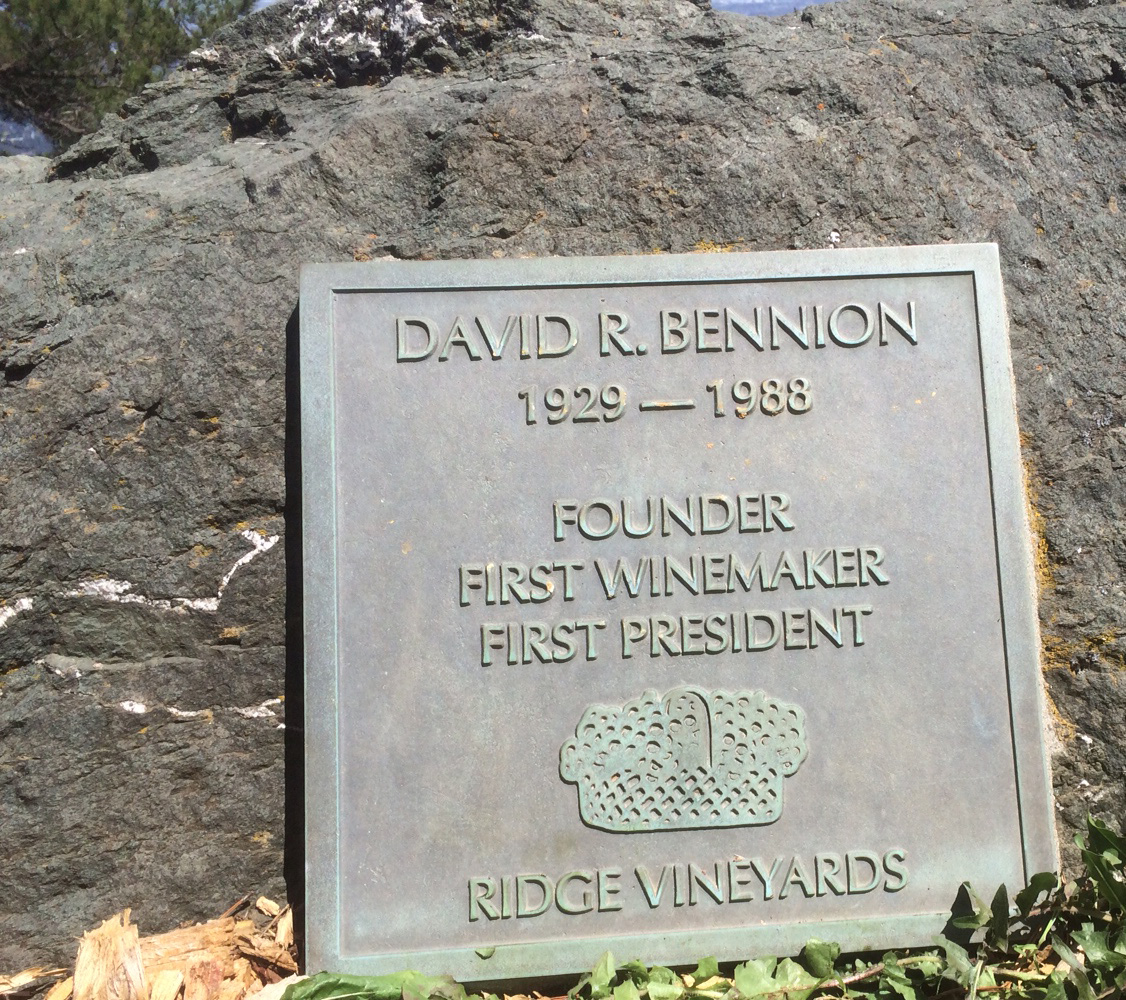
A plaque honoring David Bennion at Ridge Vineyards

On March 28, 1988, Bennion was killed in an automobile accident on the Golden Gate Bridge. After his death, a Trust Fund and Fellowship at UC Davis was created to continue his viticulture work and preserve the history of winemaking in the Santa Cruz Mountains. In 1976, the 1971 Ridge Monte Bello placed fifth in the Judgement of Paris. On May 24, 2006, a 30-year re-enactment of the Judgment of Paris was held with simultaneous tastings in London and in Napa. The judges tasted the original ten wines, now over thirty years old. The winning wine in both the London and in Napa tasting was the 1971 Ridge Monte Bello.
