= Deaths in February 2007 =

The following is a list of notable deaths in February 2007.

Entries for each day are listed alphabetically by surname. A typical entry lists information in the following sequence:

- Name, age, country of citizenship at birth, subsequent country of citizenship (if applicable), reason for notability, cause of death (if known), and reference.

== February 2007 ==
=== 1 ===
- Whitney Balliett, 80, American jazz critic, cancer.
- Ray Berres, 99, American baseball player who was second-oldest living major league player, pneumonia.
- Emery Bopp, 82, American artist and art teacher.
- Gregg Browning, 85, American football player (New York Giants).
- Douglas Woodruff Hillman, 84, American district judge (United States District Court for the Western District of Michigan).
- Ahmad Abu Laban, 60, Egyptian-born Danish Muslim leader, key figure in the Muhammad cartoons controversy, cancer.
- Gian Carlo Menotti, 95, Italian-born opera composer (Amahl and the Night Visitors).
- Antonio María Javierre Ortas, 85, Spanish cardinal and prefect of the Congregation for Divine Worship (1992–1996), cardiac arrest.
- Adelina Tattilo, 78, Italian founder of Playmen magazine.
- Seri Wangnaitham, 70, Thai dancer, choreographer and national artist, heart failure.

=== 2 ===
- Edmund Arnold, 93, American newspaper designer, pneumonia.
- Vijay Arora, 62, Indian film and television actor, intestinal condition.
- Loren Grey, 91, American educational psychologist and son of Zane Grey, age-related complications.
- Billy Henderson, 67, American singer with The Spinners, diabetes.
- Joe Hunter, 79, American pianist and bandleader of The Funk Brothers.
- Terry McMillan, 53, American harmonica player.
- Gisèle Pascal, 85, French actress.
- Filippo Raciti, 40, Italian police officer, fatal injury by football hooligan.
- Eric Von Schmidt, 75, American folk/blues singer-songwriter, stroke.
- Masao Takemoto, 87, Japanese gymnast, gold medallist at 1960 Summer Olympics, bile duct cancer.
- Shannon J. Wall, 87, American union official, president of the National Maritime Union (1973–1990).

=== 3 ===
- Liliane Ackermann, 68, French Jewish community leader, writer and lecturer.
- George Becker, 78, American president of United Steelworkers (1993–2001), prostate cancer.
- Ralph de Toledano, 90, Moroccan-born American political columnist and author.
- Stephan R. Epstein, 46, British professor of economic history at LSE, epileptic seizure.
- Freda Hands, 88, British artist.
- Pedro Knight, 85, Cuban–American musician and husband of Celia Cruz.
- Mohamed Sanni-Thomas, 79, Ghanaian Olympic athlete.
- Devi Das Thakur, 77, Indian lawyer and politician, Governor of Assam (1990–1991).

=== 4 ===
- Steve Barber, 68, American Major League Baseball pitcher, pneumonia.
- Bauer, 81, Brazilian World Cup footballer.
- Paul Burwell, 57, British percussionist.
- Raymond Coulon, 96, French sculptor.
- Ilya Kormiltsev, 47, Russian poet and translator, spinal cancer.
- Barbara McNair, 72, American singer and actress, throat cancer.
- Jules Olitski, 84, Ukrainian-born American abstract painter and sculptor, cancer.

=== 5 ===
- Celso Battaia, 87, Italian footballer.
- John S. Beckett, 80, Irish musician.
- Ray Corley, 79, American basketball player.
- Arthur J. Dixon, 88, Canadian member of the Legislative Assembly of Alberta (1952–1975).
- Calvin Henry Glauser, 84, Canadian politician.
- Charles Grimes, 71, American Olympic rower (1956).
- Angela King, 68, Jamaican diplomat, Assistant Secretary-General of the United Nations (1997–2004), cancer.
- Leo T. McCarthy, 76, New Zealand-born American politician and Lieutenant Governor of California (1983–1995), kidney failure.
- Alfred Worm, 61, Austrian investigative journalist, heart attack.

=== 6 ===
- Dick Allen, 62, British film editor.
- Wolfgang Bartels, 66, German bronze medal-winning Olympic alpine skier (1964).
- Lew Burdette, 80, American baseball player, MVP of the 1957 World Series, stomach cancer.
- Helen Duncan, 65, New Zealand union leader and politician, cancer.
- Doug Gailey, 59, New Zealand rugby league player, complications of a fall.
- Lee Hoffman, 74, American science fiction and western writer, heart attack.
- Len Hopkins, 76, Canadian politician, Liberal MP from Ontario (1965–1997), pneumonia.
- Robert Kimpton, 93, Australian cricketer.
- Josef Klíma, 95, Czech Olympic basketball player (1936).
- Frankie Laine, 93, American singer ("Mule Train"), complications of hip replacement surgery.
- Reiner Merkel, 55, German manager, CEO of German Press Agency Picture Alliance, heart attack.
- Nelson W. Polsby, 72, American political scientist and author, heart failure.
- Sir Gareth Roberts, 66, British physicist and principal of Wolfson College, Oxford.
- Glenn Sarty, 77, Canadian original producer of CBC's The Fifth Estate, Take 30 and Take 60, emphysema.
- Bent Skovmand, 62, Danish plant scientist and conservationist, founder of the Svalbard Global Seed Vault, brain tumor.
- Harry Webster, 89. British automotive engineer.
- Willye White, 68, African American first 5-time U.S. track and field Olympian, pancreatic cancer.

=== 7 ===
- Tommy James, 83, American football player (Detroit Lions, Cleveland Browns, Baltimore Colts), congestive heart failure.
- Ken Kennedy, 61, American computer scientist at Rice University, pancreatic cancer.
- Josephine Lenard, 85, American baseball player (AAGPBL).
- Alan MacDiarmid, 79, Nobel winning chemist, death from a fall off a bridge .
- Fred Mustard Stewart, 74, American author, cancer.
- Brian Williams, 46, British former rugby union player for Wales and Neath RFC, heart attack.

=== 8 ===
- Joe Edwards, 85, American comic book artist best known for his Archie and Li'l Jinx comics, heart failure.
- Adele Faccio, 86, Italian civil right activist.
- Dick Harding, 72, Canadian Olympic sprinter (1956).
- Florence Melton, 95, American inventor, entrepreneur and philanthropist.
- Shelby Metcalf, 76, American coach for Texas A&M basketball, cancer.
- Ismail Semed, Chinese Muslim Uighur separatist, execution by firing squad.
- Anna Nicole Smith, 39, American 1993 Playmate of the Year, widow of J. Howard Marshall, accidental drug overdose.
- Ian Stevenson, 88, Canadian psychiatrist and reincarnation researcher.
- Peter Thornton, 81, British museum curator and historian.
- Harriett Woods, 79, American Lieutenant Governor of Missouri (1985–1989), leukemia.

=== 9 ===
- Hank Bauer, 84, American baseball outfielder and manager, three-time All Star, cancer.
- Joe Bukant, 91, American football player (Philadelphia Eagles, Chicago Cardinals).
- Francisco Calamita, 84, Spanish Olympic swimmer (1948).
- Eddie Feigner, 81, American softball player, respiratory failure.
- Benedict Kiely, 87, Irish writer and broadcaster.
- Emil Kiszka, 80, Polish Olympic sprinter (1952).
- Andrew McAuley, 39, Australian ocean kayak adventurer, presumed drowned.
- Ian Richardson, 72, British actor (House of Cards, Tinker Tailor Soldier Spy, Brazil).
- Bruno Ruffo, 86, Italian motorcycle racer, three-time world champion (1949–1951).

=== 10 ===
- Bill Clement, 91, Welsh rugby union player and soldier.
- Gary Frisch, 38, South African co-founder of Gaydar dating website, fall from balcony.
- Émile Golaz, 79, Swiss Olympic ice hockey player (1952, 1956).
- Nick Grunzweig, 88, American basketball player.
- Jeong Da-bin, 26, South Korean actress, suspected suicide by hanging.
- James C. Melby, 57, American professional wrestling historian, author and magazine editor.
- Charles S. Swartz, 67, American filmmaker, brain cancer.
- Charles R. Walgreen Jr., 100, American president of Walgreens (1939–1971), son of founder Charles R. Walgreen.
- Cardis Cardell Willis, 69, American comic.
- David Boynton, 61, American historian and photographer, hiking accident.

=== 11 ===
- Jorge Antonio, 89, Argentinian Peronist party politician and business man.
- Tony Discenzo, 71, American football player (Michigan State Spartans, Boston Patriots, Buffalo Bills).
- Lorentz Eldjarn, 86, Norwegian biochemist.
- Mario Fafangel, 92, Slovenian Olympic sailor (1952, 1960).
- Marianne Fredriksson, 79, Swedish writer and journalist, heart attack.
- Derek Gardner, 92, British marine painter.
- Karl-Heinz Hopp, 70, German rower and Olympian (1960).
- Charles Langford, 84, American Alabama state senator and lawyer, represented Rosa Parks during Montgomery bus boycott.
- Jules Maenen, 75, Dutch Olympic cyclist.
- Yunus Parvez, 75, Indian Bollywood actor, complications of diabetes.
- Jim Ricca, 79, American football player (Washington Redskins, Philadelphia Eagles, Detroit Lions), cerebral aneurysm.
- Joe Wilkinson, 72, English footballer (Hartlepool United).

=== 12 ===
- Violet Barasa, 31, Kenyan women's volleyball team captain and Olympic competitor (2000, 2004).
- Warren Batchelder, 89, American animator for Warner Bros.
- Georg Buschner, 81, East German football coach, prostate cancer.
- Jimmy Campbell, 63, British musician.
- Valucha deCastro, 77, Brazilian musician, liver disease.
- Peter Ellenshaw, 93, English-born American special effects technician (Mary Poppins, The Black Hole) and matte painter (Dick Tracy), Oscar winner (1965).
- Thomas E. Fairchild, 94, American Federal Appeals Court Judge.
- Peggy Gilbert, 102, American jazz saxophonist and bandleader, complications of hip surgery.
- Ellen Hanley, 80, American Broadway theatre actress, stroke.
- Ferenc Hemrik, 81, Hungarian Olympic ski jumper (1948).
- Joseph Low, 95, American children's book illustrator.
- John MacLeod of MacLeod, 71, British 29th chief of the Clan MacLeod, leukaemia.
- Joseph McKeown, 82, British photojournalist, after a fall.
- Hasan Özbekhan, 86, Turkish economist.
- Paolo Pileri, 62, Italian motorcycle racer (1973–1979), 1975 World Champion and Capirossi team manager, natural causes.
- Randy Stone, 48, American short film director and casting director (The X-Files), Oscar winner (1995), heart failure.
- Sulejman Talović, 18, American Salt Lake City spree killer, shot by police.
- Geraldine Warrick-Crisman, 76, African-American TV executive, former assistant New Jersey state treasurer, breast cancer.
- Eldee Young, 71, American musician, bass player for Ramsey Lewis Trio, heart attack.

=== 13 ===
- Sir Charles Harington, 96, British general.
- Elizabeth Jolley, 83, Australian author, illness.
- Bruce M. Metzger, 93, American professor at Princeton Theological Seminary and expert on Greek biblical manuscripts.
- Charlie Norwood, 65, American Republican representative from Georgia since 1995, cancer.
- Eliana Ramos, 18, Uruguayan model, heart attack caused by anorexia nervosa.
- Johanna Sällström, 32, Swedish actress.
- Sir Richard Wakeford, 84, British Air Marshal.

=== 14 ===
- Dušan Flipović, 54, Serbian Olympic rower (1972).
- Ryan Larkin, 63, Canadian animator, Oscar nominee and subject of the Oscar-winning animated short Ryan, lung cancer.
- Thomas Marealle, 91, Tanzanian politician and Paramount Chief, pneumonia.
- Benito Medero, 84, Uruguayan Minister of Agriculture (1972–1974).
- Gareth Morris, 86, British flautist and music teacher.
- John O'Banion, 59, American singer and actor, accident causing blunt force trauma.
- Lee Patterson, 77, Canadian actor (One Life to Live, Surfside 6, Texas), heart failure.
- John Penn, 85, British architect.
- Steven Pimlott, 53, British theatre director, lung cancer.
- Richard S. Prather, 85, American novelist.
- Emmett Williams, 81, American poet and Fluxus artist.

=== 15 ===
- Robert Adler, 93, Austrian-born American co-inventor of the TV remote control, heart failure.
- Bill Carson, 80, American guitarist.
- Walker Edmiston, 81, American voice actor (Transformers, Alvin and the Chipmunks, Dick Tracy), cancer.
- Terry Enyart, 56, American baseball player (Montreal Expos).
- Ray Evans, 92, American songwriter, partner of Jay Livingston for hits such as "Buttons and Bows", heart attack.
- Igor Feld, 65, Soviet Russian Olympic pole vaulter (1964).
- Stephen Gardiner, 82, British architect.
- Buddy Hancken, 92, American baseball player (Philadelphia Athletics).
- Daniel McDonald, 46, American Broadway actor, brain cancer.
- Mordkhe Schaechter, 79, American Yiddish linguist and lexicographer.

=== 16 ===
- Samararatne Dharmasena, 56, Sri Lankan Olympic sprinter (1980).
- Herminio Iglesias, 77, Argentinian Peronist Party politician.
- William Kurtz, 89, American Olympic field hockey player (1948).
- Jakov Lind, 80, Austrian Holocaust survivor and author.
- Norman Miscampbell, 81, British politician, Conservative MP for Blackpool North (1962–1992).
- Sheridan Morley, 65, British broadcaster and author, heart failure.
- Eustathe Joseph Mounayer, 91, Syrian Syriac Catholic hierarch, archbishop of Damascus (1978–2001).
- Ralph Penza, 74, American senior correspondent and substitute anchor for WNBC.
- Lilli Promet, 85, Estonian writer.
- Gene Snyder, 79, American Republican representative from Kentucky (1963–1965, 1967–1987).
- John G. Truxal, 82, American control theorist.

=== 17 ===
- Mike Awesome, 42, American professional wrestler (ECW, FMW, WCW), suicide by hanging.
- Mehmet Altınsoy, 82, Turkish politician, intracranial hemorrhage.
- Giovanni Carminucci, 67, Italian gymnast and Olympian (1960, 1964, 1968).
- Mai Ghoussoub, 54, Lebanese author and publisher.
- Jurga Ivanauskaitė, 45, Lithuanian writer, cancer.
- Mary Kaye, 83, American singer/guitarist and leader of the Mary Kaye Trio, respiratory and heart failure.
- Tom Kearns, 87, American politician and football player (Miami Hurricanes, New York Giants, Chicago Cardinals).
- Dermot O'Reilly, 64, Irish-born Canadian singer and musician with Ryan's Fancy.
- Maurice Papon, 96, French World War II Vichy government official convicted of deporting Jews to Nazi death camps.

=== 18 ===
- Chris Bearchell, 53, Canadian gay liberation activist, breast cancer.
- Joe Duckworth, 85, American football player (Washington Redskins).
- Danny Finn, 78, American basketball player (St. John's Red Storm, Philadelphia Warriors).
- Lawrence J. Fogel, 78, American computer scientist.
- Barbara Gittings, 74, American gay rights campaigner, breast cancer.
- Félix Lévitan, 95, French sports journalist and organiser.
- Bob Oksner, 90, American comic book artist (Superman, Green Lantern, Captain America), pneumonia.
- Frank M. Snowden Jr., 95, American authority on black people in the ancient world, heart failure.
- Juan "Pachín" Vicéns, 72, Puerto Rican basketball player.

=== 19 ===
- Janet Blair, 85, American actress (My Sister Eileen, The Fabulous Dorseys), complications of pneumonia.
- Obdulio Diano, 87, Argentine footballer.
- Mahala Ashley Dickerson, 94, American lawyer and civil rights advocate.
- Celia Franca, 85, British-born Canadian dancer, founder and artistic director of the National Ballet of Canada.
- Max Hugel, 81, American businessman and political figure, former Deputy Director for Operations of the CIA, cancer.
- René Imbot, 81, French general.
- Ruth Posselt, 95, American violinist and educator.
- Antonio Serapio, 69, Philippine congressman representing the city of Valenzuela, car accident resulting from cardiac arrest.

=== 20 ===
- Sir John Akehurst, 77, British general.
- F. Albert Cotton, 76, American chemist and Texas A&M University professor.
- Sir Michael Hart, 58, British judge of the High Court of England and Wales, lung cancer.
- Ronald Hilton, 95, American Stanford University professor who helped uncover the Bay of Pigs Invasion plan.
- Sir Tap Jones, 92, British air marshal.
- Siegfried Landau, 85, American musician and founding conductor of Brooklyn Philharmonic Orchestra, house fire.
- Amos Mariani, 75, Italian football player and coach (Fiorentina, A.C. Milan, national team).
- Carl-Henning Pedersen, 93, Danish painter known for his membership of CoBrA.
- Carly Ryan, 15, Australian murder victim.
- Kenneth Steer, 93, British archaeologist.
- Zille Huma Usman, 35, Pakistani minister for social welfare in the Punjab province, shot.
- Richard Tom, 86, Chinese-born American weightlifter.
- Derek Waring, 79, British actor (Z-Cars), cancer.
- Robert W. Young, 94, American linguist.

=== 21 ===
- Daniel Boemle, 36, Swiss disc jockey.
- Victor Clemett, 107, Canadian second oldest living veteran of World War I.
- Oiva Halmetoja, 86, Finnish Olympic hammer thrower (1952).
- Sherman Jones, 72, American baseball player (San Francisco Giants, Cincinnati Reds, New York Mets), and Kansas state politician.
- Jim Kennedy, 74, British cricketer.
- Arawa Kimura, 75, Japanese footballer.
- Keith Kyle, 81, British journalist, historian and broadcaster.
- John Robins, 80, British rugby union player for Wales, coach of the British Lions.
- Barry Stevens, 43, American basketball player and second highest scorer in Iowa State University history, heart attack.
- Al Viola, 87, American jazz guitarist, cancer.

=== 22 ===
- Avrohom Blumenkrantz, 62, American Orthodox rabbi, posek, and kashrut authority, complications of diabetes.
- Lothar-Günther Buchheim, 89, German author (Das Boot), painter and art collector, heart failure.
- Irwin Caplan, 87, American cartoonist (Saturday Evening Post, Collier's), Parkinson's disease.
- Jozef Dunajovec, 73, Slovak journalist and non-fiction author.
- Edgar Evans, 94, British opera singer.
- George Jellicoe, 2nd Earl Jellicoe, 88, British soldier, politician and businessman.
- Dennis Johnson, 52, American All-Star basketball player (Seattle SuperSonics, Phoenix Suns, Boston Celtics), and coach, 1979 NBA Finals MVP, cardiac arrest.
- Samuel Hinga Norman, 67, Sierra Leone leader of pro-government Kamajors militia, heart failure.
- Fons Rademakers, 86, Dutch Academy Award-winning film director (The Assault), emphysema.
- Howard Ramsey, 108, American who was one of the last surviving US World War I combat veterans.
- George André Robertson, 77, British educator and cricketer.
- Ian Wallace, 60, British drummer (King Crimson, 21st Century Schizoid Band), esophageal cancer.

=== 23 ===
- Heinz Berggruen, 93, German art collector and friend of Pablo Picasso, heart attack.
- Donnie Brooks, 71, American singer ("Mission Bell"), heart failure.
- Jock Dodds, 91, British footballer for Scotland and Blackpool F.C.
- Robert Engler, 84, American political scientist, heart ailment.
- Winthrop D. Jordan, 75, American historian, complications from amyotrophic lateral sclerosis.
- Will Maslow, 99, American Jewish leader and civil rights lawyer.
- Robert W. Richardson, 96, American railroad preservationist.
- John Ritchie, 65, British footballer for Stoke City F.C., club's record goalscorer.
- Pascal Yoadimnadji, 56, Chadian Prime Minister, brain haemorrhage.

=== 24 ===
- Bryan Balkwill, 84, British conductor.
- Bruce Bennett, 100, American actor (New Adventures of Tarzan, Treasure of the Sierra Madre), and Olympic medallist (1928), hip fracture.
- Kåre Olav Berg, 62, Norwegian Olympic Nordic skier (1968, 1972).
- Mordechai Breuer, 85, Israeli Bible researcher and Orthodox rabbi.
- Mario Chanes de Armas, 80, Cuban political prisoner.
- Charles F. Ehret, 83, American molecular biologist.
- Leroy Jenkins, 74, American composer and free jazz violinist, lung cancer.
- Lamar Lundy, 71, American football player, member of the Los Angeles Rams' "Fearsome Foursome" defensive line.
- Damien Nash, 24, American football running back for the Denver Broncos.
- George Preas, 73, American football lineman who won two NFL championships with the Baltimore Colts, Parkinson's disease.
- Paul Secon, 91, American businessman, co-founder of Pottery Barn.

=== 25 ===
- William Anderson, 85, American congressman from Tennessee and captain of the USS Nautilus.
- P. Bhaskaran, 83, Indian director and lyricist in the Malayalam language.
- Jean Grelaud, 108, French WWI veteran, one of the last three 'official' World War I veterans.
- César Keiser, 81, Swiss comedian, radio personality, and actor.
- Mark Spoelstra, 66, American folk singer and veteran of the Greenwich Village music scene, pancreatic cancer.

=== 26 ===
- John Robert Anderson, 78, Australian chemist.
- Angelo Arcidiacono, 51, Italian Olympic fencer (1976, 1984).
- Raúl Alonso de Marco, 72, Uruguayan member of the Supreme Court of Justice (1992–2002).
- Rick Chisholm, 47, Australian rugby league footballer.
- James O. Hall, 96, American historian.
- Alex Henshaw, 94, British test pilot noted for his work with Spitfire and Lancaster aircraft.
- Lena Jeger, Baroness Jeger, 91, British Labour MP for Holborn and St Pancras South and opposition spokesman in the House of Lords.
- David McGuire, 75, Australian cricketer.
- Sergio Previtali, 66, Uruguayan politician and former deputy (1990–1995).
- Hideo Takamatsu, 77, Japanese actor (The Last Emperor, Shōgun, Eijanaika), heart attack.

=== 27 ===
- George Athans Sr., 86, Canadian diver and Olympian (1936, 1948).
- Brian Belle, 92, English cricketer.
- Russell Churney, 42, British pianist, pancreatic cancer.
- Bernd Freytag von Loringhoven, 93, German World War II General, survivor of Hitler's bunker.
- Wayne Hooper, 86, American music composer, arranger and singer.
- Raimo Karlsson, 59, Finnish Olympic wrestler (1972).
- Jack Marks, 80, Canadian Chief of Metro Toronto Police (1984–1989), pancreatic cancer.
- Elbie Nickel, 84, American football player.
- Bobby Rosengarden, 82, American jazz drummer and bandleader on The Dick Cavett Show, kidney failure.
- Mel Swart, 87, Canadian politician, stroke.
- Judith Toups, 76, American birding expert and Sun Herald columnist.

=== 28 ===
- Julian Budden, 82, British opera scholar.
- Lucio Calonga, 67, Paraguayan footballer.
- Charles Forte, Baron Forte, 98, British hotelier.
- Alexander King, 98, British scientist who co-founded the Club of Rome.
- Robert Kingston, 78, American Army general, complications from a fall.
- Alexei Komech, 70, Russian architectural historian, cancer.
- Princess Marie Adelaide of Luxembourg, 82, Luxembourgish princess.
- Arthur M. Schlesinger Jr., 89, American historian and Pulitzer Prize-winning author, heart attack.
- Sir John Smith, 83, British founder of the Landmark Trust.
- Billy Thorpe, 60, Australian rock musician, cardiac arrest.
