= James Kennedy =

James, Jim, or Jimmy Kennedy may refer to:

== Business ==
- James Gerard Kennedy Sr. (1907–1997), construction magnate
- James C. Kennedy (born 1948), billionaire; CEO and chairman of the media conglomerate Cox Enterprises
- Jim Kennedy (media executive), American media executive

== Entertainment ==
- James Kennedy (musician) (born 1980), musician, author and podcaster
- Jimmy Kennedy (1902–1984), Irish songwriter, "Istanbul (Not Constantinople)", "Teddy Bears' Picnic", "The Hokey Pokey"
- James Kennedy, author of The Order of Odd-Fish
- James Kennedy, cast member on Vanderpump Rules

== Politics ==
- James Buckham Kennedy (1844–1930), Canadian lumberman and Liberal politician
- James Kennedy (congressman) (1853–1928), U.S. congressman from Ohio, 1903–1911
- James Kennedy (Canadian politician) (1869–1915), merchant and political figure in Prince Edward Island, Canada
- James Kennedy (Australian politician) (1882–1954), Australian politician and footballer
- James Kennedy (Irish politician) (1909–1968), TD for Wexford, 1965–1968
- James Kennedy (New Hampshire politician) (born 1945), New Hampshire state representative, 2006–present
- James J. Kennedy (born 1953), mayor of Rahway, New Jersey
- James Kennedy (British politician), British Member of Parliament for Tiverton

== Sports ==
- James Kennedy (cricketer) (1949–2020), Scottish cricketer and gynaecologist
- James "Radio" Kennedy (1946–2019), American football fixture
- Jim Kennedy (Australian footballer) (1908–1980), Australian rules footballer
- Jim Kennedy (footballer, born 1934) (1934–2003), Scottish footballer (Celtic FC, Greenock Morton FC, Scotland)
- Jimmie Kennedy (b. 1952), American football tight end
- Jimmy Kennedy (footballer) (1883–1947), Scottish footballer
- Jimmy Kennedy (rugby league), rugby league footballer of the 1910s and 1920s for Hull F.C.
- Jimmy Kennedy (American football) (born 1979), professional American football player
- Jimmy Kennedy (hurler, born 1891) (1891–1973), Irish hurler, Carrigtwohill GAA, Cork GAA
- Jimmy Kennedy (hurler, born 1926) (1926–2007), Irish hurler for Tipperary and Dublin
- Jimmy Kennedy (wrestler) (born 1988), American wrestler
- Jim Kennedy (manager) (1862–1904), Major League Baseball manager, Brooklyn Gladiators, 1890
- Jim Kennedy (infielder) (born 1946), Major League Baseball player for the St. Louis Cardinals
- Jim Kennedy (cricketer) (1932–2007), English cricketer
- J. Walter Kennedy (1912–1977), commissioner of the National Basketball Association

== Other ==
- James Kennedy (bishop) (1408–1465), Bishop of Dunkeld and St Andrews
- James Shaw Kennedy (1788–1865), British General and military writer, Knight Commander, Order of the Bath
- James Kennedy (engineer) (1797–1886), British locomotive engineer
- James Kennedy (social psychologist) (born 1950), American social psychologist, originator of particle swarm optimization
- James Kennedy (historian) (born 1963), American historian, professor, University of Amsterdam
- James Kennedy (security guard) (1930–1973), Scottish security guard, posthumously awarded the George Cross
- D. James Kennedy (1930–2007), televangelist, founder of Coral Ridge Presbyterian Church, Fort Lauderdale, Florida
- James Kennedy (priest), Irish Anglican priest
- James M. Kennedy (1865–1930), American military surgeon and brigadier general
- James Mackintosh Kennedy (1848–1922), Scottish-American poet, editor, and engineer
- James P. Kennedy Jr., American attorney
- James 'Jibs' Kennedy, guitarist and backing vocalist of Oceans Ate Alaska

== See also ==
- William James Kennedy, known as Jim Kennedy, British geologist and museum director
- Jamie Kennedy (disambiguation)
