= William Kurtz =

William Kurtz may refer to:

- William Kurtz (photographer), German-American artist, illustrator, and photographer
- William Kurtz (field hockey), American field hockey player
- William Henry Kurtz, U.S. Representative from Pennsylvania
- William Joseph Kurtz, Polish prelate of the Roman Catholic Church

== See also ==
- Wilhelm Kurz (disambiguation)
