= Engler =

Engler is a surname of German origin. Notable people named Engler include:

- Adolf Engler (1844–1930), German botanist
- Bernd Engler (born 1954), German Anglicist, president of the University of Tübingen
- Chris Engler (born 1959), American basketball player
- Daniel Engler (born 1977), American wrestling referee
- Hartmut Engler (born 1961), German singer, musician group Pur
- Henry Engler (born 1946), Uruguayan neuroscientist
- John Engler (born 1948), American politician and businessman, Governor of Michigan
- Karl Engler (1842–1925), German chemist, academic and politician
- Kevin P. Engler (born 1959), American politician
- Marguerite M. Engler (1956–2023), American nurse scientist and physiologist
- Michael Engler, American television director
- Robert Engler (1922–2007), American political scientist
- Selli Engler (1899–1972), German journalist
- Steven Engler (religion scholar) (born 1962), Canadian religion scholar
- Steven Engler (Minnesota politician) (born 1949), American farmer and politician
- Tina Engler (born 1972), American author
- Yves Engler (born 1979), Canadian political activist
