= Michael Hart =

Michael Hart, Mike Hart, or variants may refer to:

== Politicians ==
- Michael Hart (Australian politician) (born 1960), Australian politician in Queensland
- Michael Hart (mayor) (c. 1814–1878), New Zealand politician
- Michael J. Hart (1877–1951), American politician in Michigan

== Sportsmen ==
- Michael Hart (footballer) (born 1980), Scottish footballer
- Michael Hart (rower) (born 1951), British rower in 1972 Summer Olympics
- Mike Hart (American football) (born 1986), American football player and coach
- Mike Hart (outfielder, born 1958), Major League Baseball (MLB) outfielder for the Minnesota Twins and Baltimore Orioles
- Mike Hart (outfielder, born 1951), MLB outfielder for the Texas Rangers
- Mike Hart (poker player) (active since 1984), American poker player

== Others ==
- Michael Hart (judge) (1948–2007), judge of the High Court of England and Wales
- Michael Hart (political scientist) (born 1956), British academic at Exeter College, Oxford
- Michael H. Hart (born 1932), American physicist, amateur historian, and self-described white separatist
- Michael S. Hart (1947–2011), American founder of Project Gutenberg
- Mickey Hart (born 1943), drummer and musicologist with the Grateful Dead
- Mike Hart (singer-songwriter) (1943–2016), English poet and singer/songwriter from Liverpool
- Mikey Freedom Hart, American singer-songwriter, multi-instrumentalist, and record producer
- Mick Hart (1970–2020), Australian musician
