= Romer Grey =

American novelist (1909–1976)

- Born: Romer Zane Grey; October 1, 1909; Manhattan, New York City, New York, U.S.
- Died: March 8, 1976 (aged 66); Pasadena, California, U.S.
- Occupations: Writer, producer
- Spouses: Dorothy Olson (m. 1930; div. 1934) Wilma Morris (m. 1935, divorced) Octave Grey (before 1976)
- Children: 1

Romer Zane Grey (October 1, 1909 – March 8, 1976) was an American author and screenwriter. He was the eldest son of the Western novelist Zane Grey. He wrote Western novels and books on fishing. Grey was also a scenario writer for Paramount Pictures, and a producer of feature movies or television episodes based on his father's novels, along with his younger brother Loren Grey.

== Early life ==
Grey was born in Manhattan, New York City, on October 1, 1909, the son of Lina "Dolly" Roth Grey. and Zane Grey. He had a younger brother (Loren Grey and sister.)

He attended Pasadena Military Academy, in Pasadena, California and when he was eleven he and 15 of his classmates spent five weeks hiking the High Sierras in eastern California on the border with Nevada.

== Writing career ==
Grey attended the University of California at Los Angeles (UCLA), but left before graduation to begin writing. In 1929, when he was 20 years old, he wrote The Cruise of the Fisherman on his father's yacht, The Fisherman. In 1930 it was reported he was writing a travel book for boys about a recent trip to the South Seas islands.

Much of his work was connected to his father's books and projects. He helped his father gather material for Zane Grey books, and is credited as the author of the Big Little Book series based on Zane Grey’s King of the Royal Mounted newspaper comic. After his father's death, Grey wrote new stories about characters from his father's novels, including Buck Duane and Laramie Nelson.

== Animation ==
In 1930, when Grey was 21, he rented a studio in Hollywood and hired a staff of animators to make cartoons about Binko the Bear Cub, but the endeavor was not successful; Grey never secured a distribution deal amidst fierce competition. Grey lured animators from Walt Disney Productions with higher pay; the McKimson brothers, Robert and Thomas, created Binko and worked on the films as animators before being hired by what would later become Warner Bros. Cartoons, working on the vastly more successful Looney Tunes and Merrie Melodies series. Other animators who were hired by Grey included Pete Burness, Ken Harris, Volney White, Cal Dalton, Robert Stokes, Lou Zukov and Preston Blair.

== Movie and television work ==
In 1935 Grey was signed as a writer for Paramount Pictures in Hollywood, and in October of that year it was reported he was adapting two of his father's novels for the movie studio. In 1939 (the year of his father's death), he was producing short movie theater films that featured his father trout fishing. In 1955 Grey, his younger brother Loren, and Hal Hudson created Zane Grey Productions, Inc. to produce television shows based on his father's books.

== Personal life ==
Grey married Dorothy Olson on April 12, 1930, at an Episcopal church in Las Vegas, Nevada. It was a double wedding with Lionel Bernard Jr. (friend of Grey) and Jean Read (friend of the bride) also marrying. The two couples left for a double honeymoon trip to "points of interest in Utah and Arizona" before the Greys and the Bands returned to Pasadena, where they would be living.

Four years later, in 1934 Dorothy Grey filed for divorce, charging that Grey "failed to manifest interest in making a home for her". The couple had been separated since November 1, 1932. Mrs. Grey sought custody of their 21-month-old son Romer Zane Grey Jr. The divorce was granted September 14, 1934. Mrs. Grey was given custody of their son, and Romer Grey was ordered to pay $50 per month in support.

A year after the divorce, on October 19, 1935, Grey eloped with his father's secretary, Wilma Morris. In June 1939, when Wilma Grey went to local court on a drunk driving charge, it was reported that "$500 bail was posted by her estranged husband Romer Grey."

When Grey died of pneumonia at age 66 in 1976, he was married to Octave "Bee" Grey. She died in 1985.

== Later life and death ==
Grey's brother, Loren Grey, stated that Romer died an alcoholic from working as a writer in the shadow of his famous father.

Grey died on March 8, 1976, at Huntington Memorial Hospital in Pasadena, California from complications of pneumonia at age 66. Grey was survived by his widow, brother and sister, his son, and five grandchildren.

== Works ==
=== Fiction ===
- Last Stand at Indigo Flats
- The Rider of Distant Trails
- Gun Trouble in Tonto Basin
- High Valley River
- King of the Range
- Siege at Forlorn River
- Three Deaths for Buck Duane
- King of the Outlaw Horde
- The Lawless Land
- Buck Duane: King of the Range
- The Other Side of the Canyon
- Beyond the Mogollon Rim
- Buck Duane: Rider of Distant Trails
- Nevada Jim Lacy: Beyond the Mongolian Rim
- Yacqui: Siege at Forlorn River

=== Nonfiction ===
- The Cruise of The "Fisherman"
- The "Fisherman" Under the Southern Cross
