= Toups =

Toups is a French surname found in Cajun communities. Notable people with the surname include:

- Alzina Toups (1927–2022), American chef
- David Toups (born 1971), American bishop of the Diocese of Beaumont, Texas
- Judith Toups (1930–2007), American birder and columnist
- Mary Oneida Toups (1928–1981), American occultist
- Wayne Toups (born 1958), American Cajun singer
