= Jamie Kennedy (disambiguation) =

Jamie Kennedy (born 1970) is an American actor and comedian.

Jamie Kennedy may also refer to:

- Jamie Kennedy (ice hockey) (born 1946), Canadian hockey player, World Hockey Association
- Jamie Kennedy (chef), Canadian chef

== See also ==
- Jamie DeWolf (born 1977), American poet-comedian whose birth name is Jamie Kennedy
- James Kennedy (disambiguation)
