= George G. Rockwood =

American singer and photographer

George Gardner Rockwood
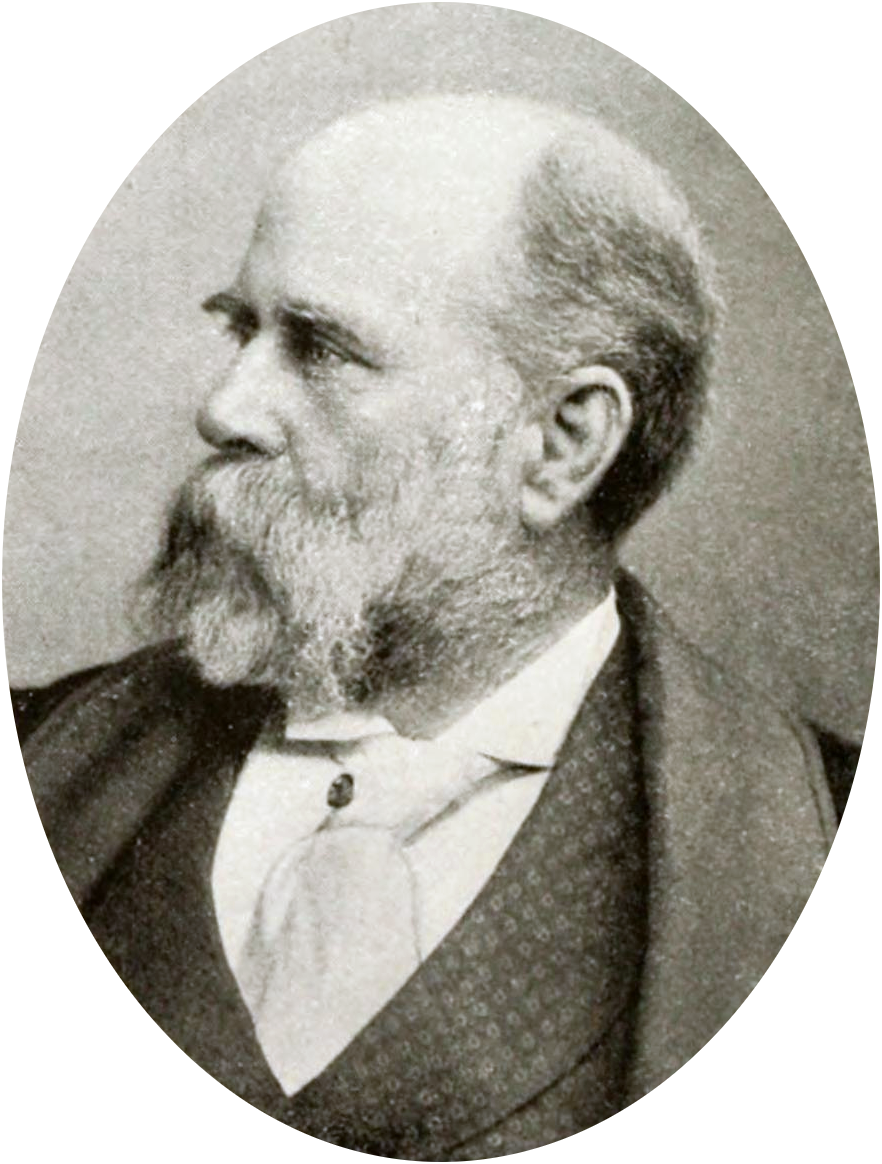
- Rockwood c. 1890s
- Born: April 12, 1832; Troy, New York
- Died: July 10, 1911 (aged 79); Lakeville, Connecticut
- Resting place: Oakwood Cemetery (Troy, New York)
- Occupation: Photographer
- Spouse: Araminta Bouton (m. 1853)
- Children: 7

George Gardner Rockwood (April 12, 1832 – July 10, 1911) was an American photographer. His New York City studio photographed over 350,000 persons.

== Early life ==
Rockwood was born in Troy, New York, in 1832 to Elihu R. Rockwood, a hotel keeper, and Martha Gardner Burnham Rockwood. George's early education was at the Ballston Spa Institute, an elite boys' boarding school. Rockwood used to say that his mind was turned to inventions by meeting Samuel Morse when the inventor of the telegraph was exhibiting his instruments at the United States Hotel in Saratoga. Rockwood was a hallboy in the hotel at that time. Morse took a liking to the young Rockwood and took time to explain the workings of his invention. As a young adult, he worked in a printing office, and then became a reporter for the local Troy newspaper. The 1855 New York State Census lists George living in Troy with his wife Araminta, newborn daughter Mary and a female servant, with his occupation listed as restauranting.

== Photography studio ==
He took up photography in St. Louis in 1853 and in 1858 produced the first carte de visite made in the United States. His first subject was Baron Rothschild. August Belmont was the first woman of whom he made a vignette carte de visite. He was an inventor as well as a photographer and made many improvements in the tools of his trade.

Rockwood moved to New York City in 1857 and went into partnership with his brother, Colonel Elihu R. Rockwood. The studio in which Rockwood and his brother came to be best known was in the Roosevelt Building at Broadway and 13 Street. It was in this studio that the Rockwoods met, photographed and made friends with so many of the famous men and women of their time. During the Civil War, Rockwood's brother Elihu enlisted, and George worked as a war photographer, working out of a mobile field van. His brother achieved the rank of colonel while serving with the 10th Regiment Massachusetts Volunteer Infantry.

Elihu Rockwood's army friends were frequent visitors at the Rockwood studio, and George Rockwood got to know them well. He was fond of relating his talks with Major Anderson, General Dix, and others who had taken part in the war. He knew Horace Greeley well and made several photographs of him, both in the studio and in the woods near Chappaqua where Greeley posed, axe in hand. For a short period of time in 1865 Rockwood's studio employed photographer William Kurtz, prior to his pioneering work with halftone printing.

== Personal life ==
Rockwood married Araminta Bouton in 1853. They had several children, one of whom, George H. Rockwood, was also a photographer and associated with his father in business. Rockwood's reputation brought him a large business, but near the time of his brother Elihu's death in 1908 he filed for bankruptcy, with assets consisting of a note for $66 (equivalent to $2,365 in 2025), two patents and 514 shares "of no value".

Rockwood was for many years the tenor in the quartet in Henry Ward Beecher's Plymouth Church, which included Emma Cecilia Thursby, Antoinette Sterling, and Jules Lumbert; and for 35 years he was musical director in various well-known city churches. He was a member of the National Photographers Association and the Sons of the Revolution.

George Rockwood received an honorary PhD from Columbia University late in life for his contributions to the arts. Rockwood died at his country home in Lakeville, Connecticut, on July 10, 1911.

== Gallery ==
Selected photographs by George G. Rockwood
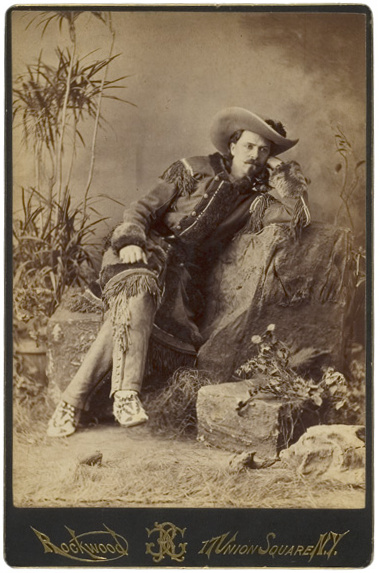
Buffalo Bill Cody

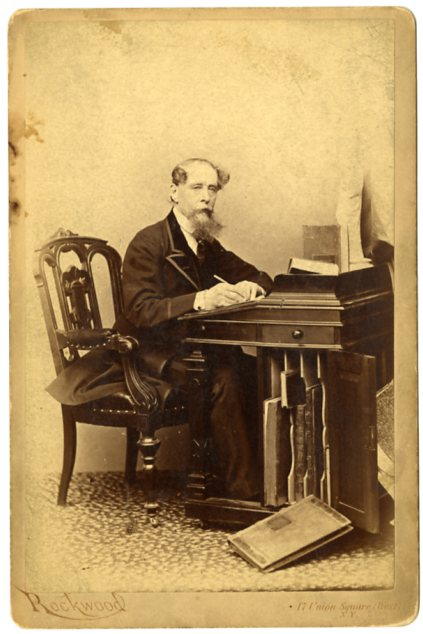
Charles Dickens, 1860s

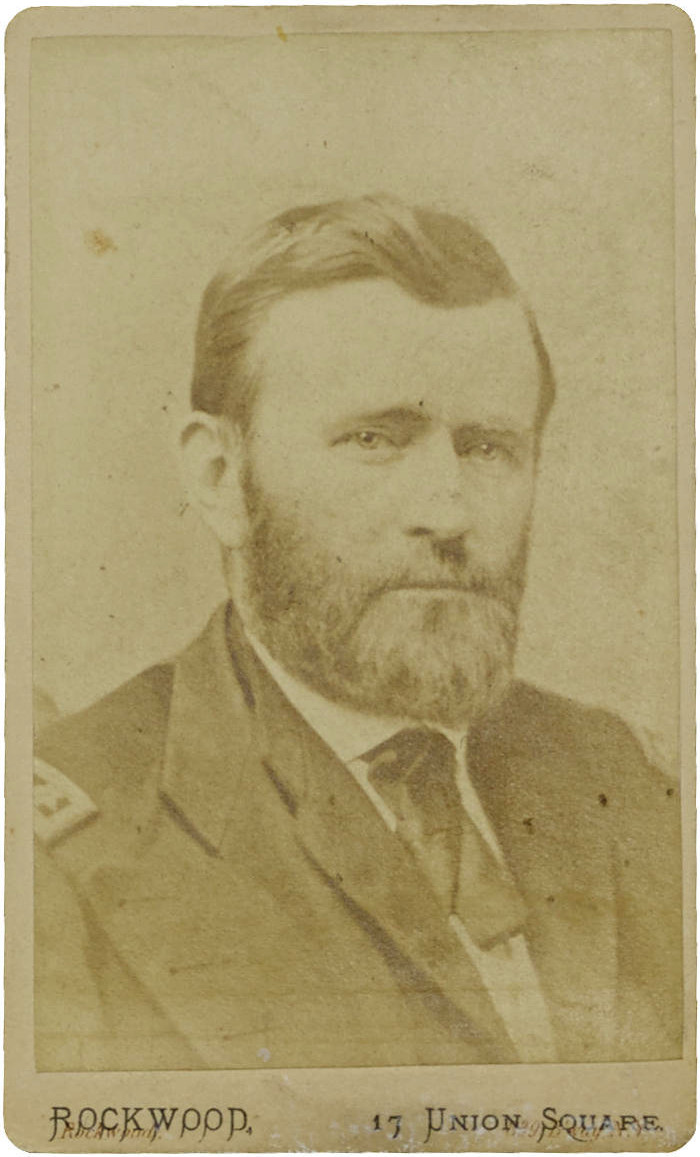
Ulysses S. Grant

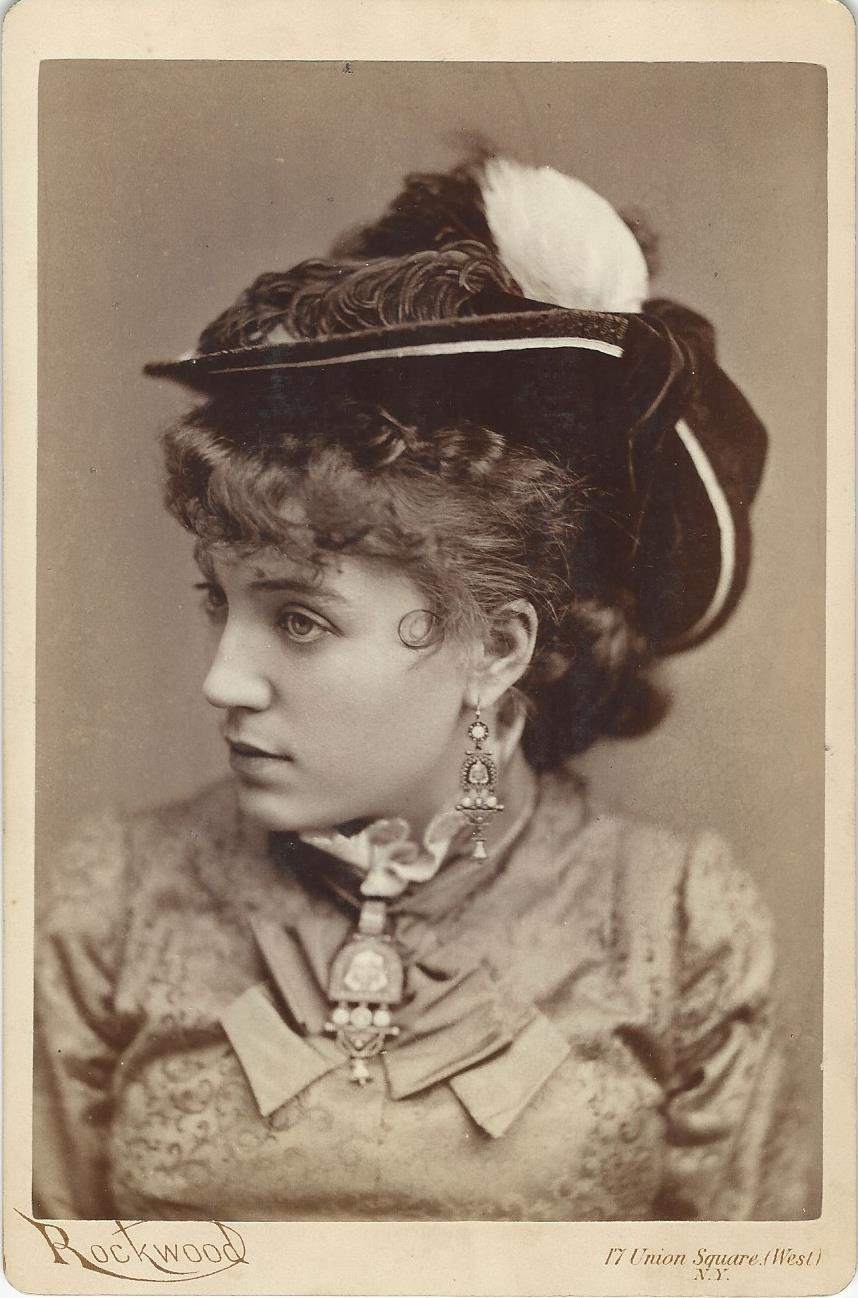
Clara Morris

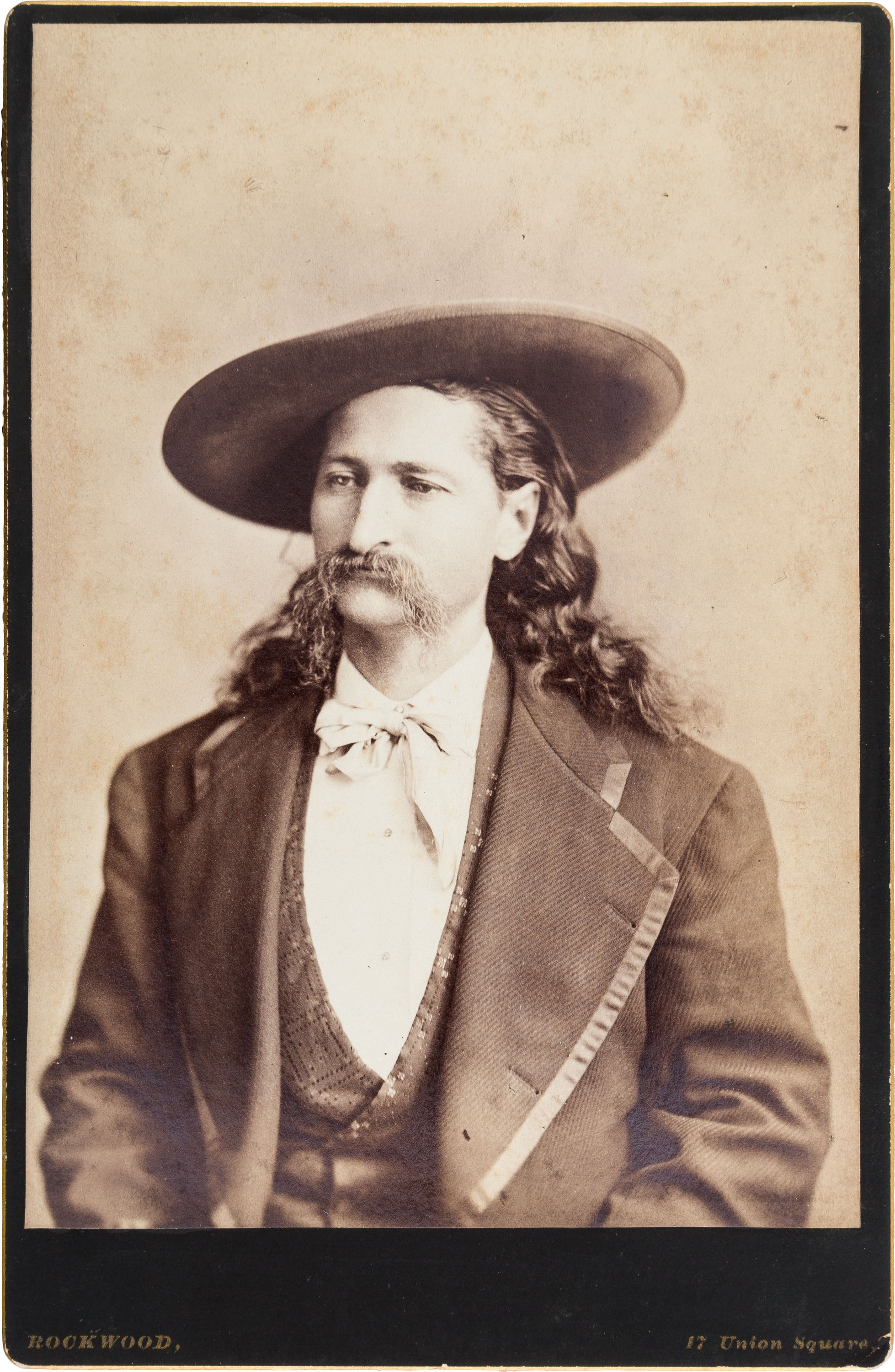
Wild Bill Hickok

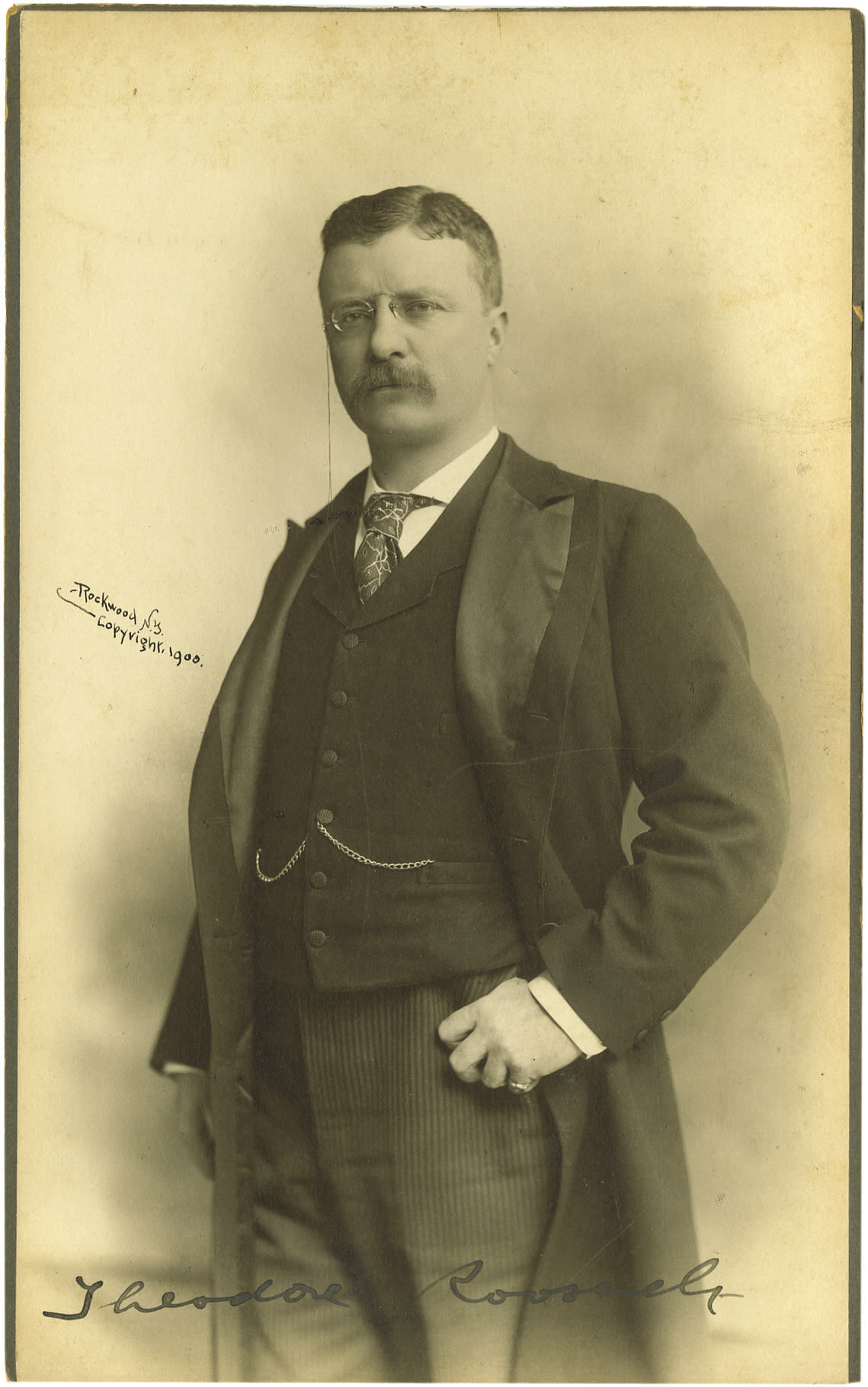
Theodore Roosevelt, 1900

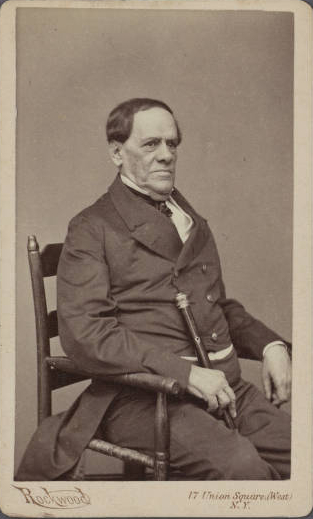
Antonio Lopez de Santa Anna, c. 1870
