= Mario Fafangel (sailor) =

Slovenian sailor

Personal information
- Nationality: Slovenian
- Born: 19 December 1914; Rab, Austria-Hungary
- Died: 11 February 2007 (aged 92); Koper, Slovenia

Sport
- Sport: Sailing

Mario Fafangel (19 December 1914 – 11 February 2007) was a Slovenian sailor. He competed at the 1952 Summer Olympics and the 1960 Summer Olympics. In 2013, he was inducted into the Slovenian Athletes Hall of Fame.

His grandson, Mario Fafangel (Jr.) is a medical doctor - epidemiologist.
