= Frederiksberg =

Part of the Capital Region of Denmark

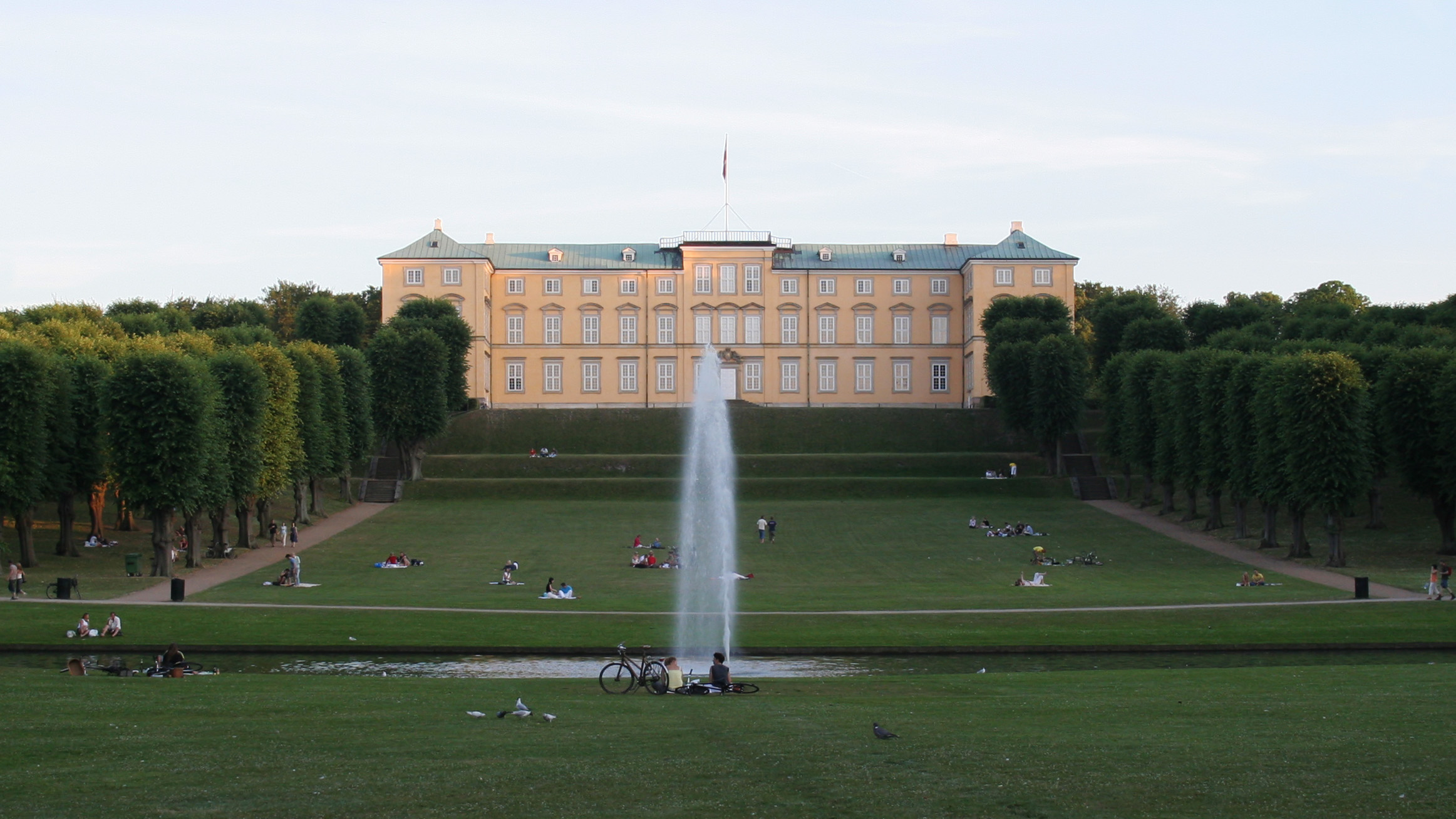
- Frederiksberg Palace seen from the park

- Logo

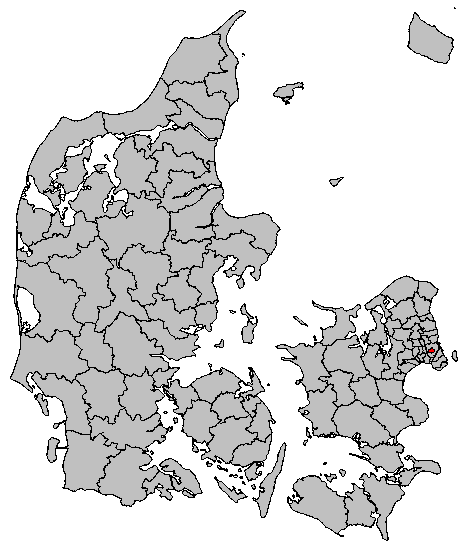
- Coordinates: 55°40′N 12°32′E
- Country: Denmark
- Region: Capital (Hovedstaden)
- Municipality: Frederiksberg

Government
  - Mayor: Michael Vindfeldt

Area (co-extensive with its municipality)
  - Total: 8.7 km^{2} (3.4 sq mi)

Population (2015)
  - Total: 103,192
  - Density: 11,861/km^{2} (30,720/sq mi)
- Time zone: UTC+1 (Central Europe Time)
  - Summer (DST): UTC+2
- Postal code: 1800-2000
- Website: www.frederiksberg.dk

Frederiksberg (Danish pronunciation: [fʁeðʁeksˈpɛɐ̯ˀ, fʁæðʁæksˈpɛɐ̯ˀ]) is a part of the Capital Region of Denmark. It is an independent municipality, Frederiksberg Municipality, separate from Copenhagen Municipality, but both are a part of the region of Copenhagen. It occupies an area of less than 9 km^{2} and had a population of 103,192 in 2015. It is the most densely populated municipality in Denmark.

Frederiksberg is an enclave surrounded by Copenhagen Municipality. Some sources ambiguously refer to Frederiksberg as a quarter or neighbourhood of Copenhagen, being one of the four municipalities in Copenhagen zone (the other three being Copenhagen, Tårnby and Dragør). However, Frederiksberg has its own mayor and municipal council, and is fiercely independent.

Frederiksberg is an affluent area, characterised by its many green spaces such as the Frederiksberg Gardens, Søndermarken, and Hostrups Have. Some institutions and locations that are widely considered to be part of Copenhagen are actually located in Frederiksberg. For example, Copenhagen Zoo as well as several stations of the Copenhagen Metro (the stations Forum, Frederiksberg, Fasanvej, Lindevang, Flintholm, Axel Møllers Have, and Frederiksberg Allé) are located in Frederiksberg. The Copenhagen S-train system also has several stations in Frederiksberg, including Peter Bangs Vej station and Flintholm station.

== History ==
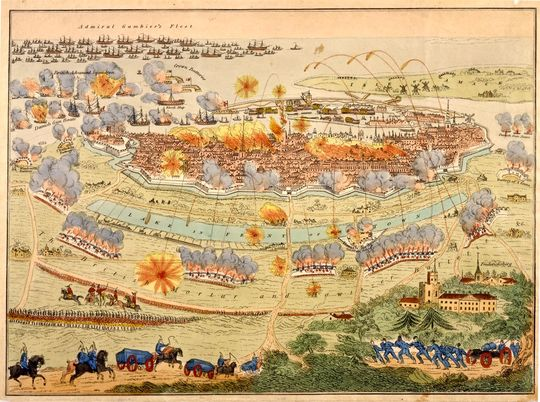
The British Bombardment of 1807. Lower right: soldiers with cannons; Frederiksberg Palace. Background: Amager and the Øresund

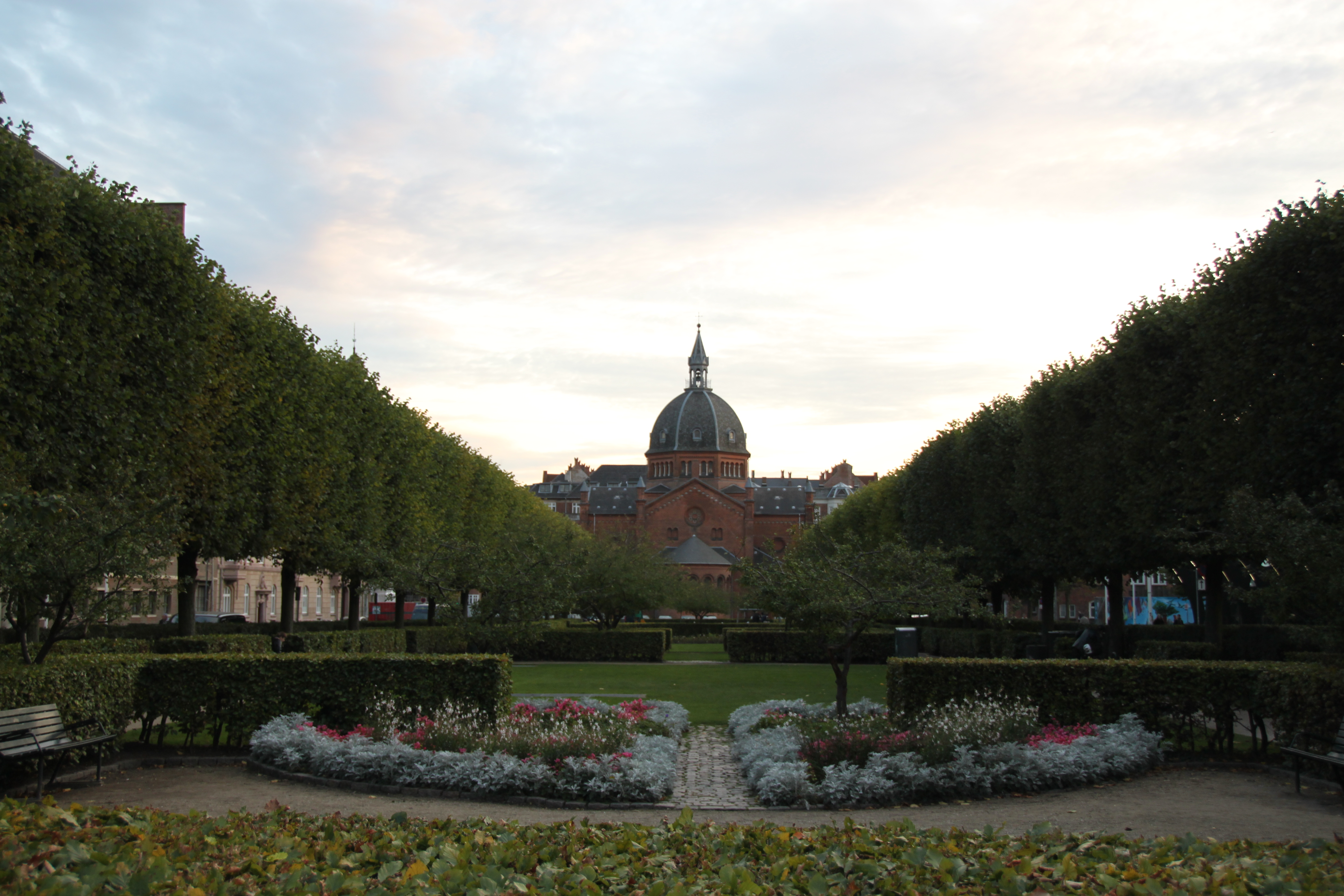
Julius Thomsens Square with St. Mark's Church at back

Frederiksberg's original name was Tulehøj, a combination of the Danish words thul (thyle) and høj (high), indicating that a thyle lived there, the reciter of eldritch times. The term is known from the Snoldelev rune stone. In Beowulf, Unferth holds the same title. In Håvamål, Odin himself is referred to as "the old thul". Thula translates as "song", like in the Rigsthula poem from the Edda. By 1443 the name Tulehøj was spelled Tulleshøy. It was regarded as Copenhagen's border to the west. People have lived in the area since the Bronze Age.

The history of Frederiksberg goes back to 2 June 1651 when King Frederik III gave 20 Danish-Dutch peasants the rights to settle at Allégade (from the words allé (tree-lined street or avenue) and gade (street)), and founded the town then named "Ny Amager" (New Amager) or "Ny Hollænderby" (New Dutchman-town) as part of a general policy of introducing modern, Dutch farming techniques into Denmark, a policy begun by King Christian IV. Farming was not very successful, and additionally, in 1697 most of the town burned down. This meant that the peasants were unable to pay taxes, and the land reverted to the crown, by now Frederik III's son Christian V.

In 1700–1703, King Frederik IV built a palace on top of the hill known as Valby Bakke (bakke = hill). He named the palace Frederichs Berg, and the rebuilt town at the foot of the hill consequently changed its name to Frederiksberg. A number of the local houses were bought by wealthy citizens of Copenhagen who did not farm the land, but rather used the properties as country houses.

The town changed slowly from a farming community to a merchant town, with craftsmen and merchants. During the summer, rooms were offered for rent, and restaurants served food to the people of Copenhagen who had left the cramped city for the open land, and to be near the royals.

Initially the town grew slowly with population growing from 1,000 in 1770, to 1,200 in 1800, and to 3,000 in 1850.

In 1852, Parliament removed restrictions which prohibited permanent construction outside Copenhagen's city walls. Almost immediately numerous residential areas were constructed, starting in the eastern part near Copenhagen, and ending in the western part farthest away from Copenhagen in 1950. This led to rapid population growth; in 1900 the population reached 80,000, and in 1950 Frederiksberg peaked with a population of 120,000.

Today Frederiksberg consists almost entirely of 3- to 5-story residential houses, large single-family homes, and large parks; only a few small areas with light industry remain.

== Geography ==
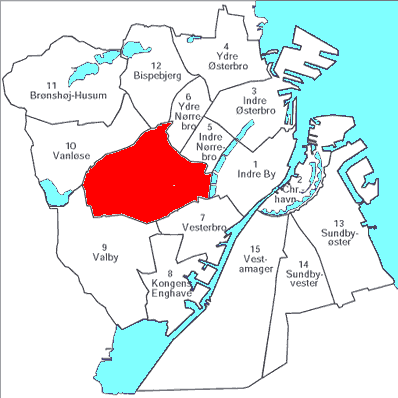
Fredericksberg's location inside Copenhagen's municipality area

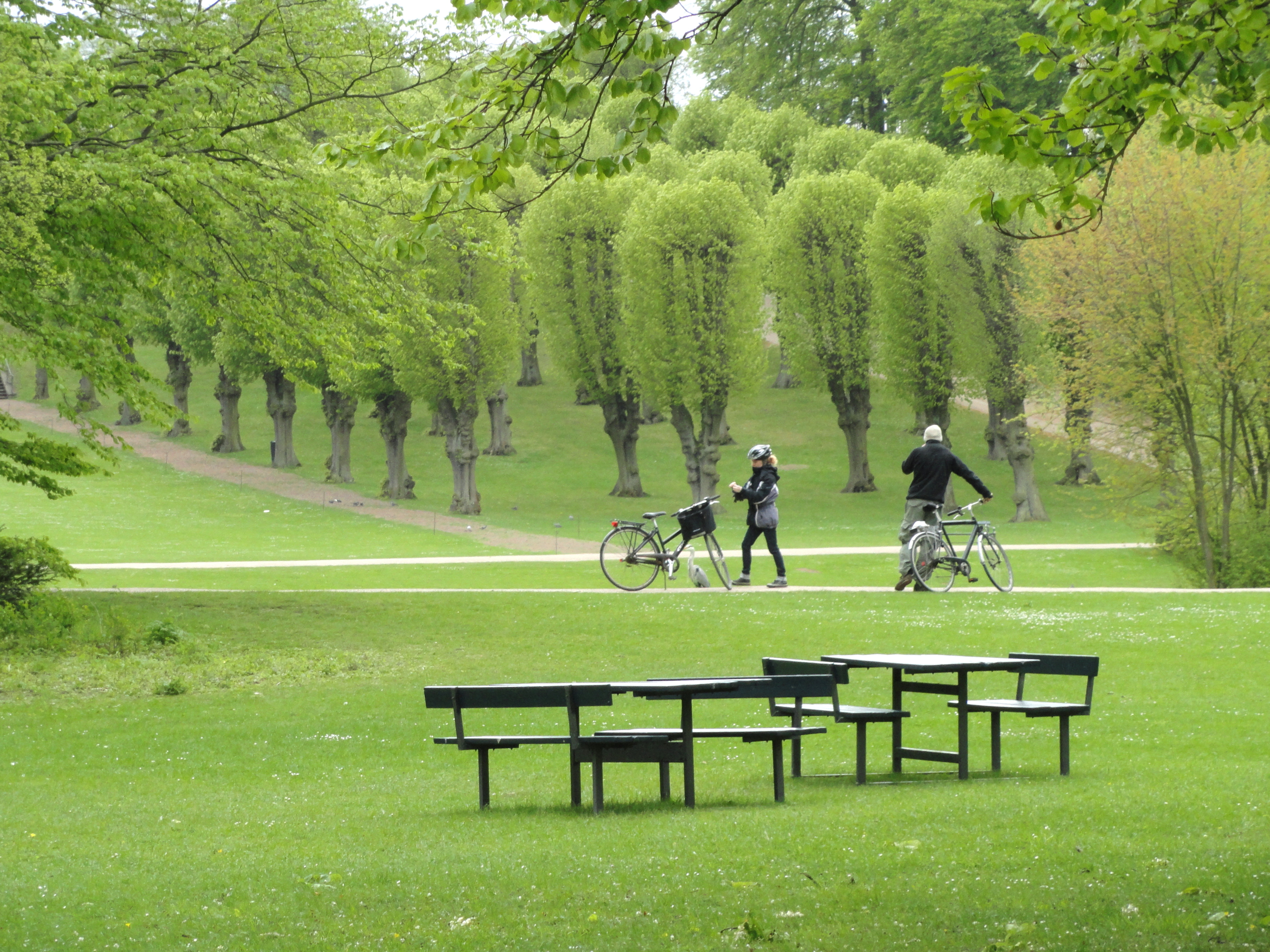
Frederiksberg Have

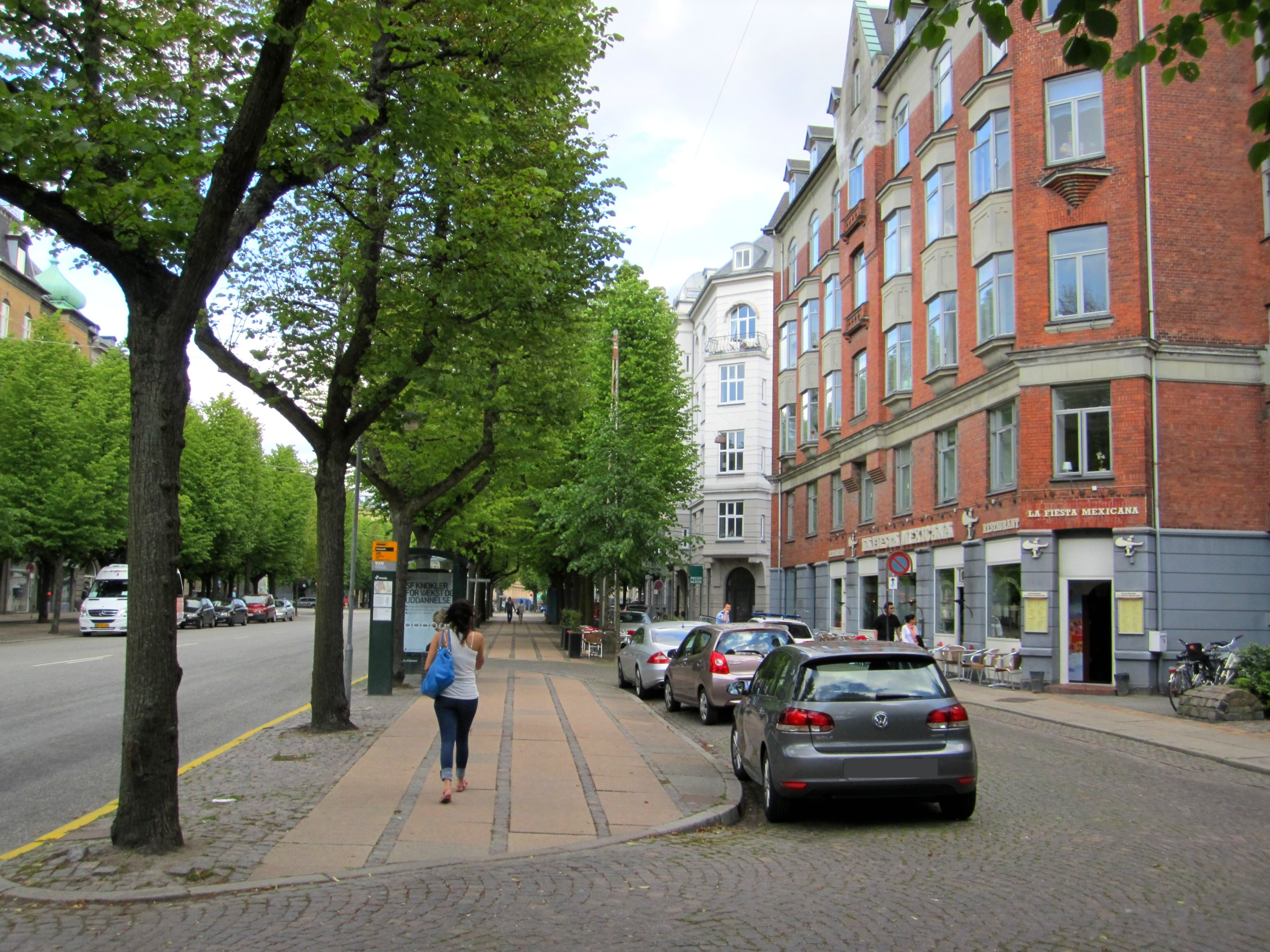
Frederiksberg Allé

Frederiksberg, which lies west of central Copenhagen, is completely surrounded by boroughs forming part of the city of Copenhagen – the result of an expansion of the Copenhagen Municipality's boundary in 1901, which nevertheless did not include Frederiksberg in the list of municipalities to be incorporated in the enlarged area. Frederiksberg is thus effectively a municipal island within the country's capital – a unique phenomenon in present-day Europe. Other than administratively, however, it is largely indistinguishable in character from the districts of Copenhagen city which surround it. Municipal taxes in Frederiksberg are also lower than those in Copenhagen proper, which attracts a more affluent population.

Frederiksberg has several stations on the Copenhagen Metro system, and is home to the tallest residential structure in Denmark and the second tallest residential building in Scandinavia: the 102-metre high Domus Vista.

== Culture ==
The Danmark Rundt cycling race traditionally finishes on Frederiksberg Alle, often in a sprint finish.

=== Education ===
Frederiksberg houses the University of Copenhagen's Frederiksberg Campus, Copenhagen Business School, 9 public schools (run by the municipality), 3 private schools, 1 technical college, and more.

The Lycée Français Prins Henrik, a French international school, is in Frederiksberg.

=== Shopping ===
The 3 streets Gammel Kongevej, Godthåbsvej, and Falkoner Alle are the busiest shopping streets. The town also houses the Frederiksberg Centret shopping mall.

=== Main sights ===
- Frederiksberg Campus (University of Copenhagen)
- Frederiksberg Gardens
- Frederiksberg Hospital
- Frederiksberg Palace
- Frederiksberg Town Hall
- Copenhagen Business School
- Copenhagen Zoo
- Royal Danish Military Academy
- F.C. Copenhagen's training facilities, Number 10

== Demography ==
Historical population

Year	Pop.	±%
1769	1,030	—
1787	1,143	+11.0%
1801	1,172	+2.5%
1840	2,304	+96.6%
1850	2,874	+24.7%
1860	8,164	+184.1%
1870	16,878	+106.7%
1880	26,510	+57.1%
1890	46,954	+77.1%
1901	76,231	+62.4%
1911	97,237	+27.6%

Year	Pop.	±%
1921	104,815	+7.8%
1930	106,251	+1.4%
1940	113,208	+6.5%
1950	118,993	+5.1%
1960	114,285	−4.0%
1970	101,874	−10.9%
1980	88,287	−13.3%
1990	85,611	−3.0%
2000	90,327	+5.5%
2010	96,718	+7.1%
2020	104,305	+7.8%

== Transport ==
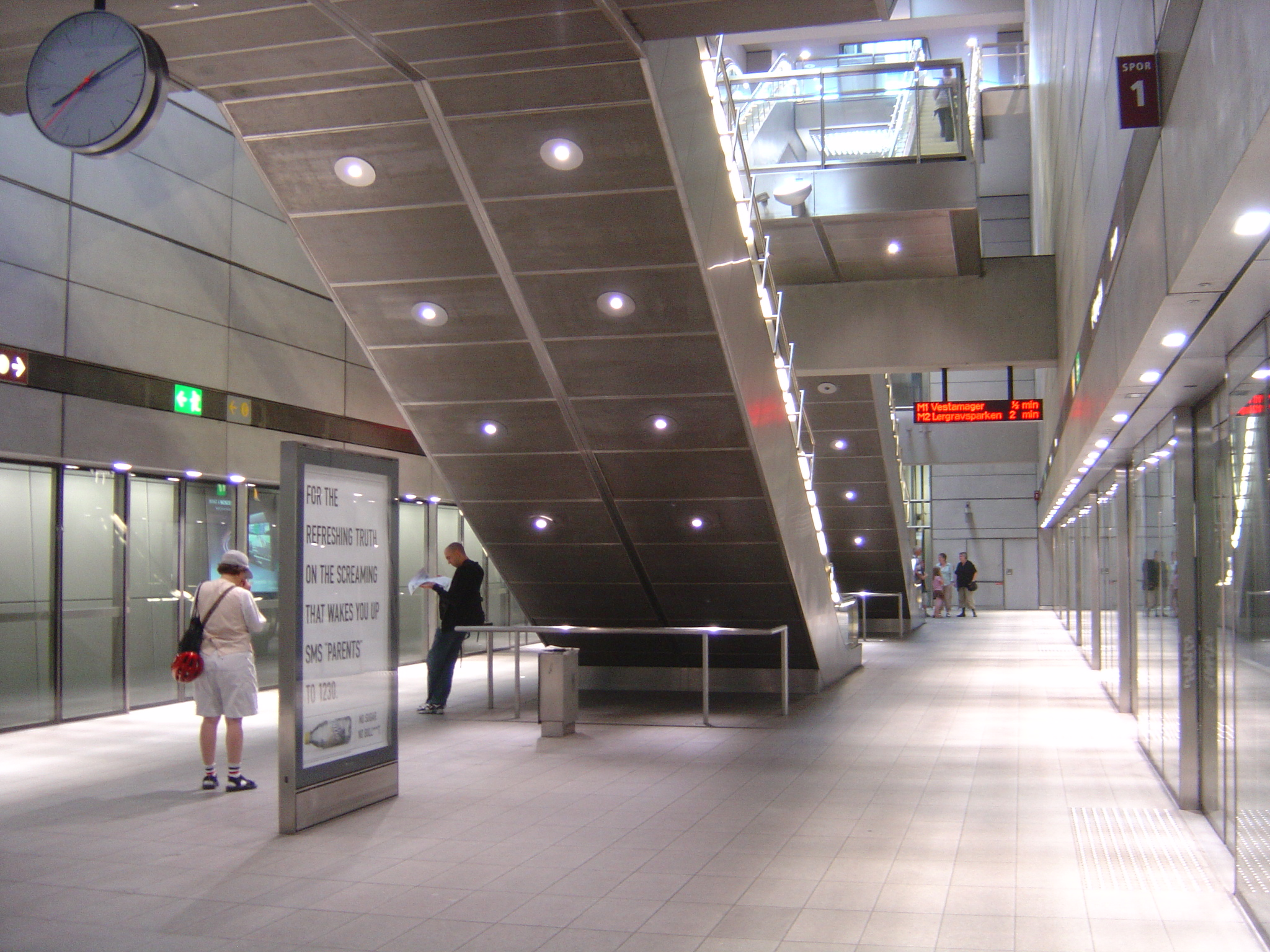
Metro in Frederiksberg

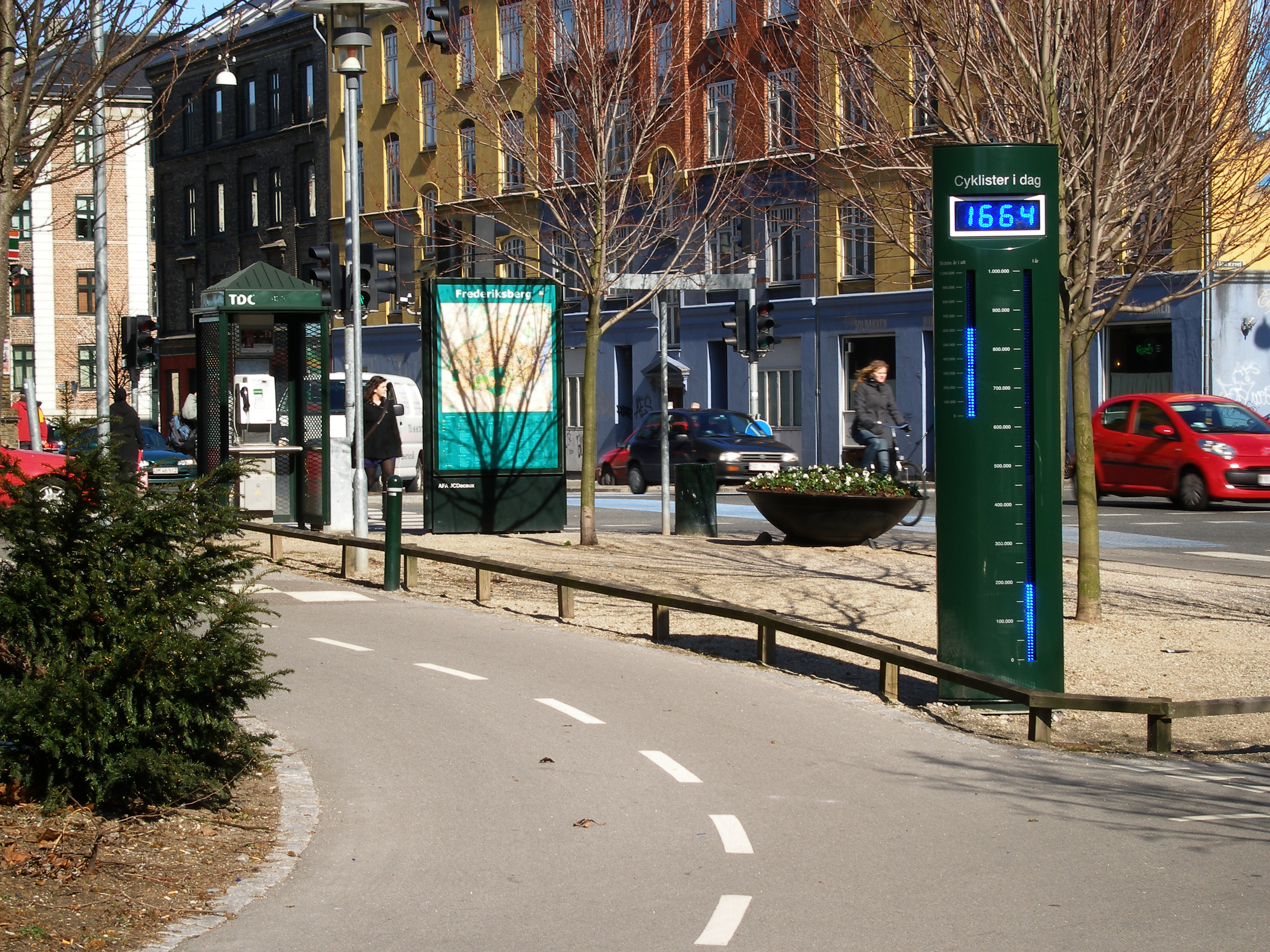
Cycling route

The town is served by the Frederiksberg station and the Fasanvej station, opened in 2003 on the Copenhagen Metro. It serves the M1, M2 and M3 (the City Circle Line) lines and is connected with bus services.

The S-Train urban rail and suburban rail network can be reached through Peter Bangs Vej station, Fuglebakken station and Grøndal station.

== Notable people ==
=== Arts and writing ===
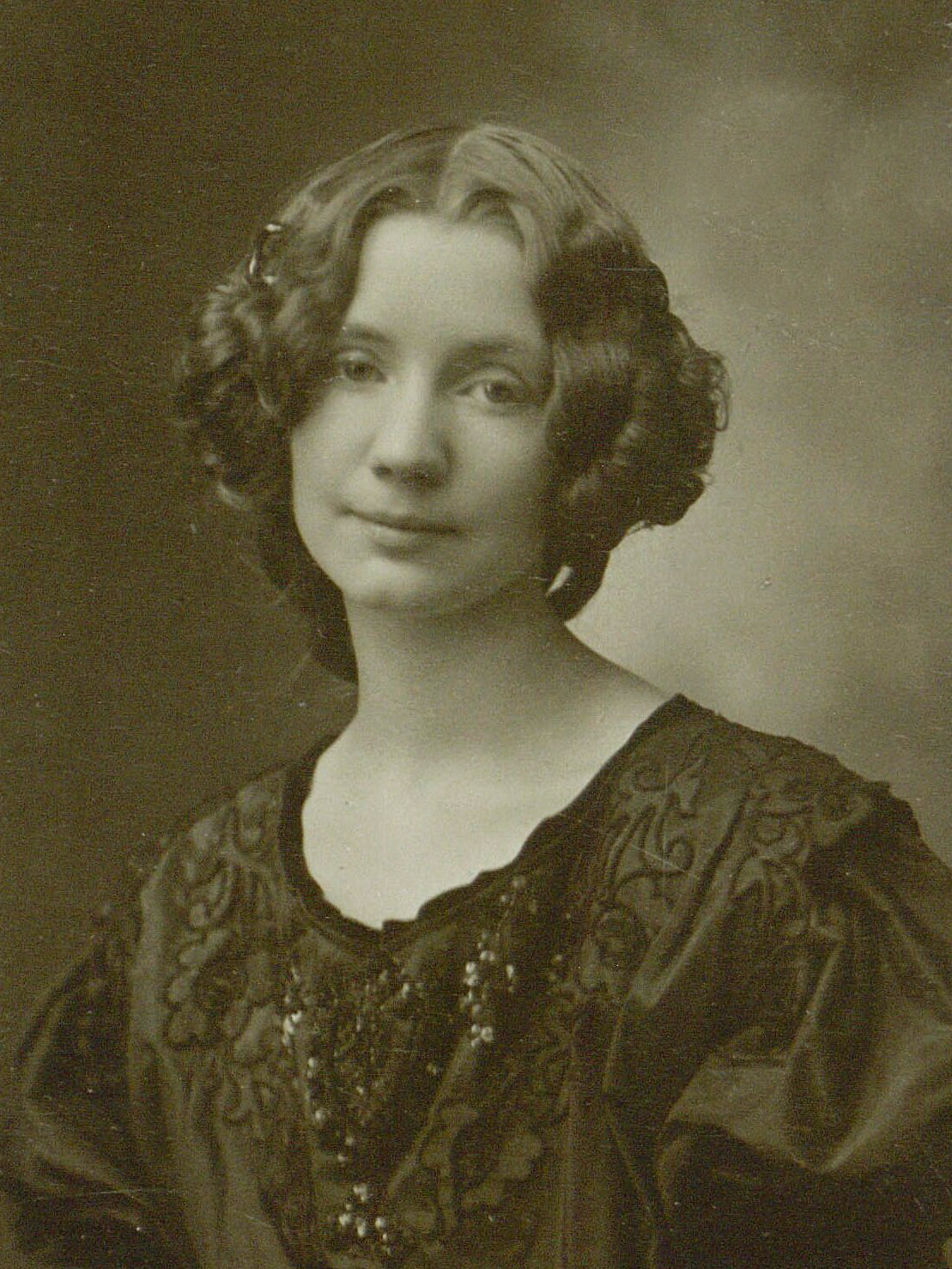
Gerda Wegener, 1904

- Kamma Rahbek (1775–1829), artist, salonist and lady of letters
- Asger Hamerik (1843–1923), composer of classical music
- Marie Luplau (1848–1925), artist and educator, active in the women's movement
- Axel Olrik (1864–1917), folklorist and scholar of mediaeval historiography
- Marie Krøyer (1867–1940), painter
- Frederik Lange (1871–1941), painter
- Anna Wulff (1874–1935), educator pioneering kindergarten teaching
- Harald Giersing (1881–1927), painter, buried here
- Robert Storm Petersen (1882–1949), cartoonist, writer, animator, painter and humorist
- Gerda Wegener (1886–1940), illustrator and painter, art nouveau and later art deco
- Einar Utzon-Frank (1888–1955), sculptor and academic
- Mogens Wöldike (1897–1988), conductor, choirmaster, organist and scholar
- Gottfred Eickhoff (1902–1982), sculptor
- Helen Schou (1905–2006), sculptor most known for her works of horses.
- Victor Brockdorff (1911–1992), painter who joined the Odsherred Painters
- Erik Christian Haugaard (1923–2009), American writer of children's books
- Leif Panduro (1923–1977), writer, novelist and dramatist
- Bent Fabric (1924–2020), composer and pianist
- Frank Jæger (1926–1977), writer of poetry and radio plays
- Anders Bodelsen (born 1937), writer
- Mette Winge (1937–2022), novelist, literary critic
- Søren Hansen (born 1943), painter
- Claus Bjørn (1944–2005), author, historian and broadcaster
- Roald Als (born 1948), cartoonist
- Esben Holmboe Bang (born 1982), chef and owner of three Michelin star restaurant Maaemo

=== Acting and entertainment ===
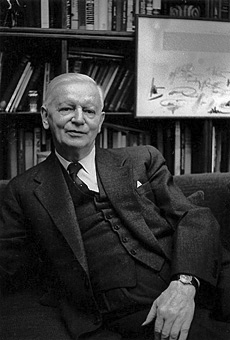
Carl Theodor Dreyer, 1965

- Carl Theodor Dreyer (1889–1968), film director
- Ib Mossin (1933–2004), actor, singer, director and heartthrob
- Birgitte Price (1934–1997), actress
- Bo Christensen (1937–2020), film producer
- Jesper Langberg (born 1940), actor
- Jørgen de Mylius (born 1946), radio and TV personality
- Louise Frevert (born 1953), belly dancer, pornographic actress and MP 2001–2007
- Claes Bang (born 1967), actor and musician
- Sofie Gråbøl (born 1968), actress
- Christina Chanée (born 1979), Danish-Thai pop singer, lives here

=== Politics and public office ===
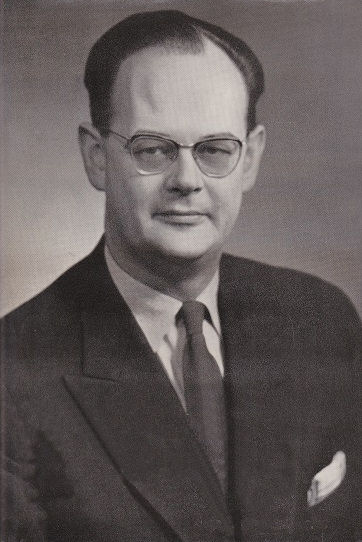
Viggo Kampmann, 1960

- Carl Christian Hall (1812–1888), statesman and twice Council President of Denmark
- Viggo Kampmann (1910–1976), Prime Minister of Denmark 1960–1962
- Emil Balslev (1913–1944), surveyor and member of the Danish resistance
- Torben Tryde (1916–1998), lieutenant colonel, writer, Olympian and resistance fighter
- Mette Groes (1937–2014). politician, social worker and academic
- Per Stig Møller (born 1942), politician, a member of the Folketing 1984–2015, held several ministerial posts
- Hans Hækkerup (1945–2013), politician, member of parliament and Minister of Defence
- Erland Kolding Nielsen (1947–2017), Director General and CEO of the Danish Royal Library
- Lars Barfoed (born 1957), politician, Conservative People's Party leader 2011–2014
- Pia Gjellerup (born 1959), politician, Member of Folketinget and solicitor
- Christian Friis Bach (born 1966), the Secretary General of the Danish Refugee Council
- Ida Auken (born 1978), politician and member of Parliament
- Jeanette Oppenheim (born 1952), member of the Copenhagen City Council and MEP
- Grethe Fenger Møller (born 1941), lawyer and Conservative People's Party politician

=== Science and design ===
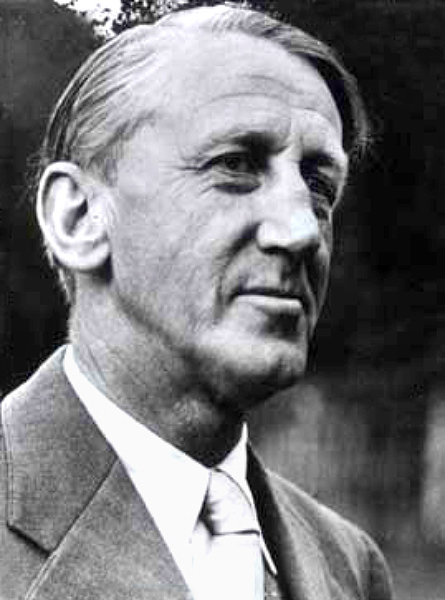
Kaare Klint, c. 1945

- Ferdinand Meldahl (1827–1908), architect
- Knud Andersen (1867–1918), zoologist
- Kaare Klint (1888–1954), architect and father of modern Danish furniture design
- Ole Wanscher (1903–1985), furniture designer
- Finn Juhl (1912–1989), architect, interior and industrial designer and introduced Danish Modern to America
- Peter Naur (1928–2016), computer science pioneer
- Per Brinch Hansen (1938–2007), Danish-American computer scientist
- Bent Skovmand (1945–2007), plant scientist and conservationist
- Arne Astrup (born 1955), nutritionist and professor

=== Sport ===
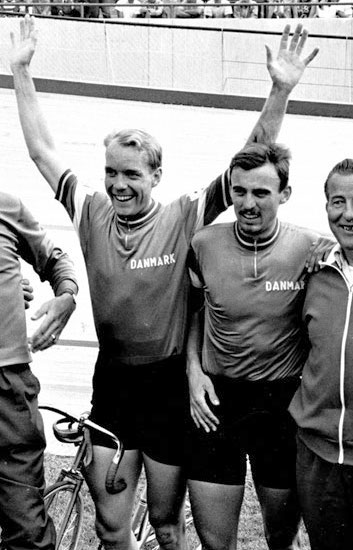
Per Lyngemark, (left) 1968

- Charles Winckler (1867–1932), athlete, Olympic champion
- Christian Grøthan (1890–1951), footballer
- Ebbe Schwartz (1901–1964), football administrator
- Pauli Jørgensen (1905–1993), football player and manager
- Torben Ulrich (born 1928), tennis player and writer
- Per Lyngemark (1941–2010), track cyclist, Olympic champion
- Per Røntved (born 1949), footballer
- Ivan Nielsen (born 1956), footballer
- Kent Nielsen (born 1961), football player and manager
- Jan Bartram (born 1962), footballer
- Michael Laudrup (born 1964), footballer
- Søren Colding (born 1972), footballer
- Thomas Delaney (born 1991), footballer
- Cecilie Uttrup Ludwig (born 1995), road cyclist
- Rasmus Winther (born 1999), gamer

== Twin towns ==
Frederiksberg practices twinning on the municipal level. For the twin towns, see twin towns of Frederiksberg Municipality.
