= Søren Hansen (artist) =

Danish painter (born 1943)

- Born: 1943; Frederiksberg
- Known for: Painting

Søren Hansen (born 1943) is a Danish painter.

== Notable collections ==
- Displacement, 1970–1980, oil on canvas; in the collection of the Statens Museum for Kunst, Copenhagen, Denmark

== See also ==
- Hornung, Peter Michael (12 April 2023). "En kunstnersøn finder sig selv: Maleren og grafikeren Søren Hansen fylder 80 år". Politiken (in Danish).
