= Wilhelm Kurz =

Wilhelm Kurz could refer to:

- Wilhelm Adolfovich Kurz (1892–1938), Austrian-born Soviet politician
- Wilhelm Sulpiz Kurz (1834–1878), German-born botanist in Asia
- William Kurtz (photographer) born Wilhelm Kurz (1833–1904), German-born American photography pioneer
