= Victor Clemett =

Canadian war veteran

Victor Lloyd Clemett (December 10, 1899 – February 21, 2007) was one of the last surviving Canadian veterans of World War I. Clemett was born in Toronto on December 10, 1899. He was able to enlist at the age of 16 in January 1916 by lying about his age, claiming that he was born January 10, 1898. His three brothers had already enlisted by then. Clemett initially briefly served in the 93rd Battalion before being transferred to the 109th Battalion. He was part of the Canadian Forestry Corps in Northern England. He was then deployed to France in 1917. Although he had volunteered to join the fighting on the frontlines, the Armistice of 11 November 1918 ended the war prior to his arrival on the front. Victor died in Toronto, Ontario, Canada at age 107.
