= James Kennedy (New Hampshire politician) =

American politician

Member of the New Hampshire House of Representatives from the Rockingham 13th district
- In office 2006–2008

Personal details
- Born: August 17, 1945 (age 81) Chelsea, Massachusetts
- Party: Democratic

James Kennedy is a Democratic former member of the New Hampshire House of Representatives. He represented the Rockingham 13th District from 2006 to 2008.
