= Jean Grelaud =

- Born: October 26, 1898; Paris VII^{e}, France
- Died: February 25, 2007 (aged 108) Paris XIII^{e}, France
- Allegiance: French Army
- Service years: 1917–1920
- Rank: Enlisted as First Class
- Conflicts: First World War; Second World War
- Awards: Knight of the Legion of Honor; World War I Victory Medal

Jean Grelaud (October 26, 1898 – February 25, 2007) was, at age 108, one of the last three "poilus" or official French veterans of the First World War. He died at the age of 108 years and 122 days.

== Life ==
Mobilized on March 10, 1917, he participated as a soldier a month later in the Second Battle of the Aisne on the Western Front. In July 1918, he had been captured by the German army during the Second Battle of the Marne, but he escaped, although he only came back to France on November 21, 1918, so after the Armistice. He was demobilised in 1920.

Jean Grelaud also took part in the Second World War as a fighter, and for this war he awarded the Croix du combattant volontaire 1939-1945, but refused to give account to media of what he'd exactly done. His life was kept secretive as well. For example, his death was announced eight days later, on March 5, 2007, according to his last wishes.

=== Awards ===
- Knight of the Legion of Honor
- Croix du combattant volontaire 1939–1945
- Combatant's Cross
- 1914–1918 Commemorative war medal
- 1914–1918 Inter-Allied Victory
