= Bernd Engler =

German Anglicist and literary scholar

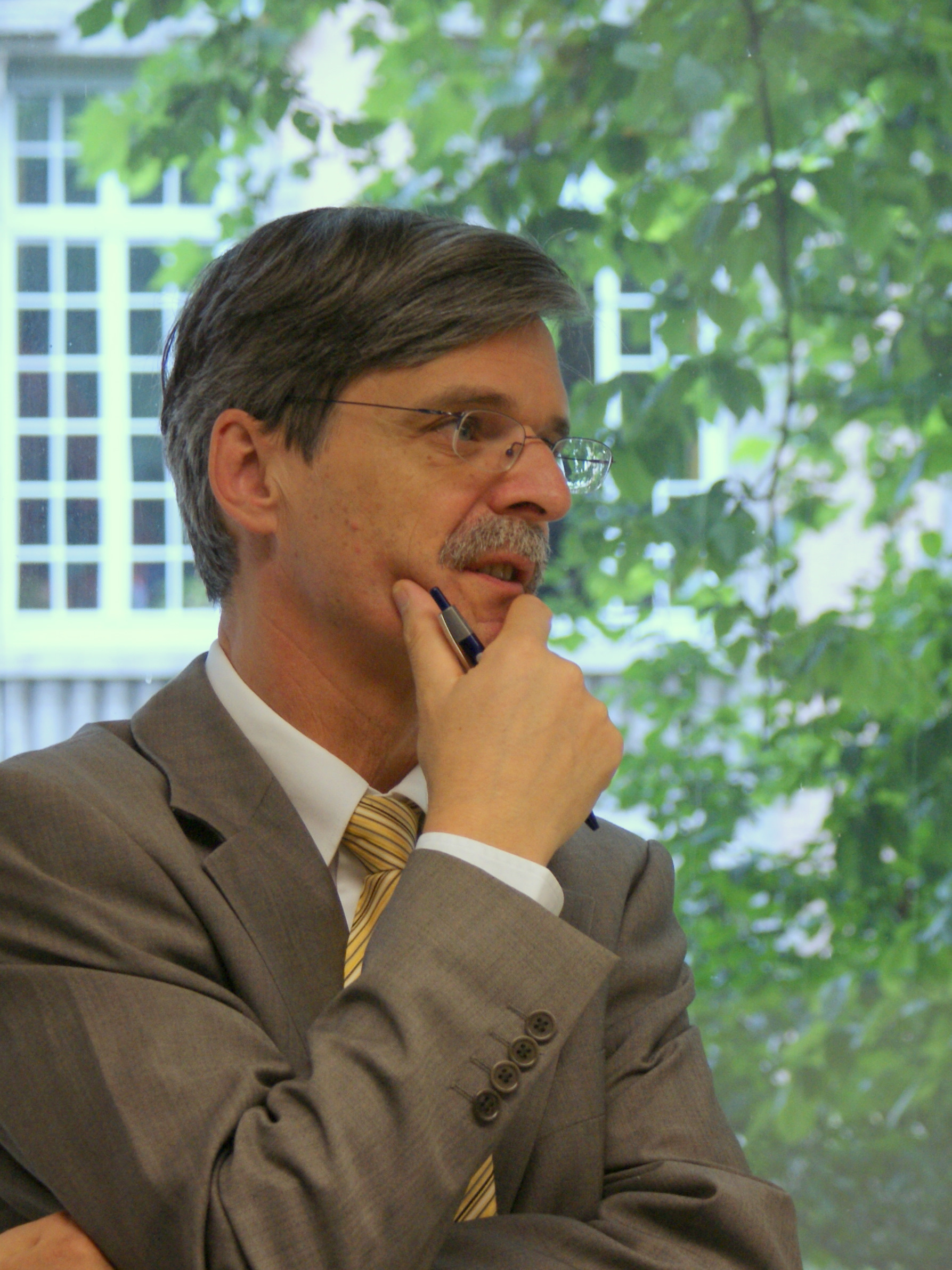
- Bernd Engler (2008)
- Born: 21 April 1954 (age 70)
- Citizenship: Germany
- Occupation(s): Anglicist and university president
- Employer: University of Tübingen

Bernd Engler (born 21 April 1954) is a German Anglicist and literary scholar. Since October 2006 he is President and Vice-Chancellor of the University of Tübingen, Germany.

== Early life and education ==
Engler was educated at the University of Freiburg, Germany, and the University of Kent, England. He graduated in English and German at the University of Freiburg in 1980. After his doctorate in American literature he started a postdoctoral qualification which he finished in 1989.

== Career ==
In 1989, Engler became a visiting professor at the University of Massachusetts, United States. After working as a visiting scholar at the University of Sussex, UK, and as an interim professor of American studies at the University of Erlangen–Nuremberg, Germany, he returned to the United States. In 1991–1992 he worked as a research fellow at the University of North Carolina at Chapel Hill. Since 1992 he has been professor of American studies at the University of Tübingen, Germany.

In 2006 Engler was elected president and vice-chancellor of the University of Tubingen. He was re-elected in 2011. In his term the University of Tübingen was successful in the German Universities Excellence Initiative.

== Other activities ==
- University Hospital of Tübingen, deputy chairman of the Supervisory Board
- Max Planck Institute for Biological Cybernetics, member of the board of trustees

== Publications ==
- American Cultural Icons: The Production of Representative Lives. Hg. Günter Leypold und Bernd Engler. Würzburg: Königshausen & Neumann, 2010.
- A Companion to American Cultural History: From the Colonial Period to the End of the 19th Century. Hg. Bernd Engler und Oliver Scheiding. Trier: WVT, 2009.
- Key Concepts in American Cultural History: From the Colonial Period to the End of the 19th Century. Hg. Bernd Engler und Oliver Scheiding. 2nd edition. Trier: WVT, 2007.
- Millennial Thought in America: Historical and Intellectual Contexts, 1630-1860. Hg. Bernd Engler, Joerg O. Fichte und Oliver Scheiding. Trier: WVT, 2002.
- Re-Visioning the Past: Historical Self-Reflexivity in American Short Fiction. Hg. Bernd Engler und Oliver Scheiding. Trier: WVT, 1998.
- Historiographic Metafiction in Modern American and Canadian Literature. Hg. Bernd Engler und Kurt Müller. Paderborn: Schöningh, 1994.
