= Jozef Dunajovec =

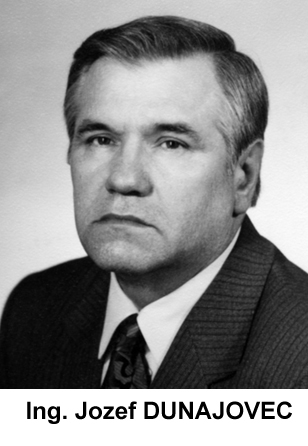
- Jozef Dunajovec
- Born: 23 March 1933; Nesluša, Czechoslovakia
- Died: 22 February 2007 (aged 73); Bratislava, Slovakia

Jozef Dunajovec (23 March 1933 – 22 February 2007) was a Slovak journalist, essayist and non-fiction author.

== Biography ==
Dunajovec, born in 1933, graduated from the "High Agriculture School and Economic University" in Bratislava. During his studies he joined the editorial team of the daily Smena, and later he worked for Rolnické noviny, Hospodárske noviny, Nové slovo, Mladé rozlety, and Predvoj. He finished his journalist career as a Managing Editor of Krásy Slovenska.

== Works ==
Besides a range of editorials, articles, essays and reportages, he wrote eighteen books. His most well-known works are:

- 1966 - The Exhorting Backwaters (Mŕtve ramená volajú)
- 1974 - The Human Footmarks (Po ľuďoch stopy), Through The Back Roads (Poľnými cestami)
- 1976 - The River People (Riečni ľudia) in Hungarian Ember és folyó (1977)
- 1980 - The Bread (Chlieb)
- 1995 - A Dramatic Event on the 1801st Kilometer (Dráma na kilometri 1801), A Planner's Odyssey (Projektantova odysea)

He was a co-author of the books

- 1974 - Motherland's Chronicle (Kronika rodnej zeme)
- 1975 - Homeland in Pictures (Rodná zem v obrazoch)
- 1986 - Mirrors of the Slovak Rivers (V zrkadlách slovenských riek)

== Death ==
He died on February 22, 2007, aged 73.
