= Jim Kennedy (media executive) =

American media executive

Jim Kennedy is an American media executive who has been executive vice president and chief communications officer for News Corp since 2013.

== Early life and education ==
Kennedy grew up in Wallingford, Connecticut. He earned his bachelor of arts degree at the University of Rochester in 1975 and his master of arts in communications and public affairs journalism from American University in 1977.

== Career ==
Kennedy began his career in public service, working in the Clinton White House as deputy assistant to the president, deputy press secretary, and senior advisor to the White House Counsel. He has also served as head of communications to Vice President Al Gore, Senator Hillary Clinton, Senator Joe Lieberman, and the Clinton Foundation.

He transitioned to the private sector in 2005, taking a position as senior vice president for corporate communications at Sony Pictures Entertainment in Culver City, California, later becoming executive vice president. He moved to New York City in 2011 to become senior vice president for strategic communications at Sony Corporation of America.
