= Reiner Merkel =

German manager

Reiner Merkel (January 28, 1952 - February 6, 2007) was a German manager, photographer and CEO of German Press Agency Picture Alliance.

Merkel studied at Justus Liebig University Giessen. After working for the "Deutscher Sportbund (DSB) in Hesse" (German Sports Federation) he became head of dpa's picture services Deutsche Presse-Agentur (dpa), a well-known news agency. Merkel was involved in developing "global media services" und "news aktuell". Since 2002 he was CEO of "dpa Picture Alliance", a platform of the six large stock photographies akg-images, Bildagentur Huber, dpa-Bilderdienste, kpa photo archive, OKAPIA, and Picture Press. Merkel was initiator of the dpa international facsimile broadcasting.

Along with the National Olympic Committee of Germany and the OC of 2006 FIFA World Cup he was engaged in a global online-picture services for the Olympic Games as well as 2006 FIFA World Cup.

Merkel, who was married and lived in Friedrichsdorf near Frankfurt, was a well known photographer and picture artist. His work was widely exhibited. He died unexpectedly during a skiing trip in the French Alps.
