= Geraldine Warrick-Crisman =

American television executive (1930–2007)

Geraldine Warrick-Crisman (May 22, 1930, Gary, Indiana – February 12, 2007, Scottsdale, Arizona) was a television executive.

She began her broadcasting career in the standards department of NBC's affiliate in Chicago. She became one of the first African-American executives at NBC Television in New York City, holding various positions over two decades. She was the first black president of American Women in Radio and Television. In 1981, she left NBC to become president and general manager of WNJR Radio in Union Township, Union County, New Jersey. New Jersey Gov. Thomas Kean soon appointed her assistant state treasurer.

In the 1990s, Warrick-Crisman moved to the Port Authority of New York and New Jersey, where she worked in public affairs and survived the 1993 World Trade Center explosion, which killed six people.

She retired to Scottsdale with her husband, Bruce Crisman, in 1997, and became a member of Tanner African Methodist Episcopal Church in Phoenix. She also served on the board of the New School for the Arts in Tempe.

Warrick-Crisman died on February 12, 2007, aged 76, following a 10-year battle with breast cancer, survived by two sisters, a daughter, a son and a stepdaughter. Her husband died in 1998.

== Links ==
- Notice of death of Geraldine Warrick-Crisman; accessed November 1, 2015.
