= Émile Golaz =

Swiss ice hockey player

- Born: 21 September 1927 L'Abbaye, Switzerland
- Died: 10 February 2007 (aged 79) Neuchâtel, Switzerland
- Position: Defence
- National team: Switzerland
- NHL draft: Undrafted
- Playing career: 1949–1962

Émile Golaz (21 September 1927 – 10 February 2007) was a Swiss ice hockey player. He competed with the Switzerland men's national ice hockey team at both the 1952 and 1956 Winter Olympic Games.
