= The Order of Odd-Fish =

2008 novel by James Kennedy

- Cover for the first edition hardback
- Author: James Kennedy
- Language: English
- Genre: Children's fiction, fantasy
- Publisher: Delacorte Books for Young Readers
- Publication date: August 12, 2008
- Publication place: United States
- Pages: 416 pages
- ISBN: 0-385-73543-X

The Order of Odd-Fish is a 2008 debut children's novel by James Kennedy. The book was first published on August 12, 2008 through Delacorte Books for Young Readers, and focused upon a young girl discovering her true identity. The Order of Odd-Fish was named a Smithsonian Notable Books for Children for 2008, and in 2013 the character of Ken Kiang was named by Daniel Kraus as one of the "most evil characters in literature".

== Synopsis ==
Thirteen-year-old Jo Larouche has spent her entire life with her Aunt Lily in the deserts of California. Left with Lily as a baby, the only real clues she has about her origins are a note with the name "Jo" and a warning that she was a dangerous baby. After the events of a Christmas party prompt Lily and Jo to leave California for the surreal and outlandish Eldritch City, Jo finally begins to learn some of the truth behind her mysterious past. The two join a group known as the Order of Odd-Fish that researches information others would see as useless. But, even as they spend their days going on unconventional quests and dealing with the eccentric Odd-Fish knights, threats from a dangerous and enigmatic source will prompt Jo to claim her true destiny.

== Marketing ==
While The Order of Odd-Fish was released in 2008, Kennedy began promoting the book more heavily in 2009 after reading that a fan had created a hat based upon his book. Kennedy then released a series of satirical blogs and videos, most notably one where he "whimsically insulted Neil Gaiman". The post was well received by Gaiman, who in turn promoted the blog. In 2010 Kennedy held an art show at a Chicago gallery, where he showcased fanart based on the book.

== Reception ==
Critical reception for The Order of Odd-Fish was mixed while reader reaction was generally more positive. Reviewers for Kirkus Reviews and the School Library Journal both gave predominantly negative reviews for the book, with the School Library Journal stating that they doubted that many "teen fantasy fans will be willing to wade through the text, no matter how likable the heroine and how fascinating the world of Eldritch City". Booklist gave a more mixed review, saying that the book was good in "small doses" although "some might find it difficult to sustain interest in such determined high jinks".
