= Joe Wilkinson (footballer, born 1934) =

English footballer

Personal information
- Date of birth: 8 December 1934
- Place of birth: Seaham, England
- Date of death: 11 February 2007 (aged 72)
- Place of death: Seaham, England
- Position: Goalkeeper

Senior career*
Years	Team	Apps	(Gls)
19??–1955	West Auckland Town		
1955–1959	Burnley	0	(0)
1959–1960	Bradford City	17	(0)
1960–1962	Hartlepool United	74	(0)
Total		91	(0)
- * Club domestic league appearances and goals

Joseph Wilkinson (8 December 1934 – 11 February 2007) was an English professional footballer who played as a goalkeeper. He made 91 appearances in the Football League.

== Career ==
Born in Seaham, County Durham, Wilkinson played for West Auckland Town, Burnley, Bradford City and Hartlepools United.

He joined Bradford City in May 1959, and left the club in February 1960. For them he made 17 appearances in the Football League. He was then transferred to Hartlepools United where he played more regularly, making 74 Football League appearances over three seasons before apparently retiring. He was in goal when Hartlepools lost 10–1 to Wrexham on 3 March 1962, the club's biggest ever defeat in the Football League.
