= Mario Fafangel =

Slovenian epidemiologist

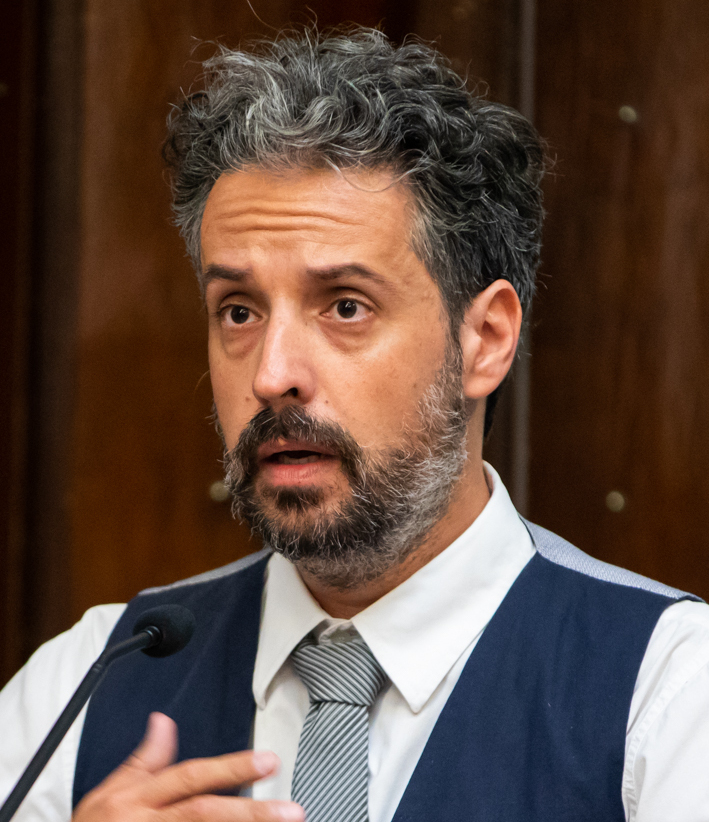
- Born: 1980 (age 45–46)
- Medical career
- Profession: Epidemiologist

Mario Fafangel Jr. /fa'fændʒel/ is a medical doctor who is Slovenia's head epidemiologist as head of the Communicable Diseases Centre at the National Institute of Public Health (NIJZ). He earned an M.D. from the University of Trieste in 2007. He resigned from Janez Janša's government's COVID-19 advisory group as chief epidemiologist because his evidence-based proposals were not listened to by political members of the group.

== Awards ==
He was awarded the Name of the Year 2020 award by major Slovenian newspaper Delo.
