= Bent Skovmand =

Danish plant scientist (1945–2007)

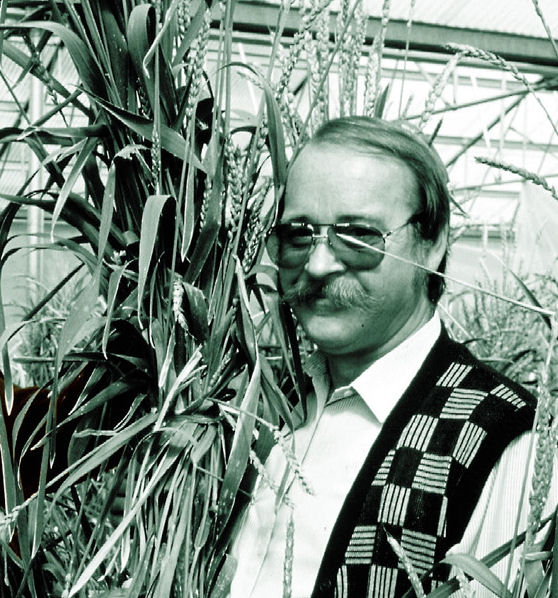
- Born: January 25, 1945; Frederiksberg, Denmark
- Died: February 6, 2007 (aged 62); Kävlinge, Sweden

Sir Bent Skovmand (January 25, 1945 – February 6, 2007) was a Danish plant scientist and conservationist. Time magazine wrote in 1991 that Skovmand, "'while not exactly a household name,' had had 'more to do with the welfare of the world's five billion people than many heads of state.'"

== Biography ==
Skovmand was born in Frederiksberg, Denmark. After serving in the Danish Army, Skovmand attended the University of Minnesota in the US as part of the Minnesota Agricultural Student Trainee international exchange program. He graduated in 1971 with a major in biological and physical sciences in agriculture, and then earned his masters in 1973 and doctorate in 1976 both in plant pathology from the University of Minnesota.

After completing his doctorate, he joined the International Maize and Wheat Improvement Center in El Batán, Mexico, where he studied older seed strains and genetic variation among widespread strains. He also worked with governments and farmers across the world to increase the use of the advanced crops being developed.

He was awarded the Knight's Cross of the Order of the Dannebrog in 2003.

Continuing his work on preserving the genetic diversity among wheats, barleys, and oats, he was appointed the director of the Nordic Gene Bank, based in Alnarp, Sweden, in 2003, and founded the Svalbard International Seed Vault. The Seed Vault, also called the "Doomsday Vault", is supported by the Global Crop Diversity Trust and aims to preserve "the raw material of agriculture" to make it available for breeding and research even in the advent of disaster, war, or climate change. The vault was scheduled to open in late 2008.

Skovmand was opposed to patenting individual genes, describing it as "like copyrighting each and every word in Hamlet, and saying no one can use any word used in Hamlet without paying the author". He routinely released his catalogs of agricultural information on CDs, which he gave away for free, never attempting to patent the work. In his work with the International Maize and Wheat Improvement Center, Skovmand set up collaborations with for-profit companies to develop improved strains of agricultural staples, with the proviso that patents not be used in developing nations.

Skovmand had four children, two with his wife Eugenia, and two by a previous marriage. Skovmand fell ill in January 2007, and died February 6, 2007, at age 62 in Kävlinge, Sweden, from complications from a malignant brain tumor.
