= James M. Kennedy =

Brigadier General San Francisco 1906

Brigadier General James M. Kennedy
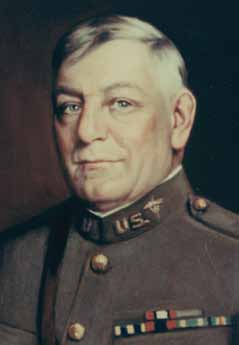
- Brigadier General James M. Kennedy, Medical Corps, U.S. Army
- Born: December 1, 1865; Troy, South Carolina
- Died: October 15, 1930 (aged 64); Letterman Army Hospital
- Burial place: Arlington National Cemetery
- Military career
- Rank: Brigadier General

Brigadier General James Madison Kennedy (December 1, 1865 – October 15, 1930) was an American Army surgeon in the U.S. Army Medical Corps. He served in multiple key posts, including commanding Letterman General Hospital at the Presidio in San Francisco and serving as Port Surgeon at the Port of Hoboken during World War I. Kennedy was awarded the Distinguished Service Medal and the Navy Cross for his wartime service.

== Early life and education ==
Born in Troy, South Carolina, Kennedy received an A.B. from the College of South Carolina in 1884, and an M.D. from the College of Physicians and Surgeons of Maryland in 1892. In 1928, he was awarded an honorary LL.D. from the University of South Carolina for his service to military medicine.

== Military career ==
Kennedy entered the Army as an assistant surgeon on May 12, 1893, advancing through successive medical ranks before attaining the grade of Brigadier General on March 3, 1926.

He served in the Spanish–American War, organizing ambulance and evacuation services in Cuba; in the Philippine Insurrection as principal assistant to the Chief Surgeon; and in World War I as Port Surgeon at Hoboken, New Jersey, where he oversaw hospital services for embarking and returning troops.

He later commanded Letterman General Hospital at the Presidio of San Francisco (1919–1922 and 1924–1926) and subsequently the Army Medical Center in Washington, D.C., until his retirement in 1929.

For his wartime service, he was awarded the Distinguished Service Medal and the Navy Cross.

== Personal life and death ==
Kennedy died of heart disease at Letterman General Hospital on October 15, 1930, at the age of 64, and was buried at Arlington National Cemetery.

Kennedy's contributions to Army medicine and his command at the Presidio are commemorated by General Kennedy Avenue, a principal roadway within the Presidio of San Francisco, named in his honor.

== See also ==
- Letterman Army Hospital
- Presidio of San Francisco
- Army Medical Department (United States)
- St. Francis Yacht Club
