= Daniel Boemle =

Swiss radio DJ

Daniel Christian Manuel Boemle, Dänu Boemle, "Sleepy Dan", "Öml" (7 November 1960 in Bern – 21 February 2007 in Les Ponts-de-Martel) was a well-known Swiss radio DJ. He presented various shows on DRS3 between 1988 and 1994. He was also a singer, author, culture critic, and painter.

== Life ==
From his early childhood onwards Boemle was considered a talented painter. By the age of 22, he owned his first studio in an old farmhouse near Bern. During this period, Boemle's artistic mentor was Werner Schwarz, who had made a name for himself by creating church windows made of old glass bottles.

In 1988 Boemle successfully applied for a job with DRS 3. During his active years as a radio DJ, he was one of the most influential and acclaimed Swiss radio DJs. Like Reeto von Gunten and François Mürner, he is considered to be one of the legendary voices of DRS 3. He resigned from DRS 3 in 1994 in order to return to painting.

In his spare time Boemle was a resident DJ at various clubs around Basel, where – according to himself – people appreciated the Funk and Jazz he played.

== Health and death ==
Boemle had been living with AIDS for many years. He eventually decided to end his life with the help of a euthanasia organisation in February 2007.

He is buried in Les Ponts-de-Martel in the Jura Mountains of Neuenburg, where he had lived since 2003.
