= Alexei Komech =

Russian architectural historian and art critic

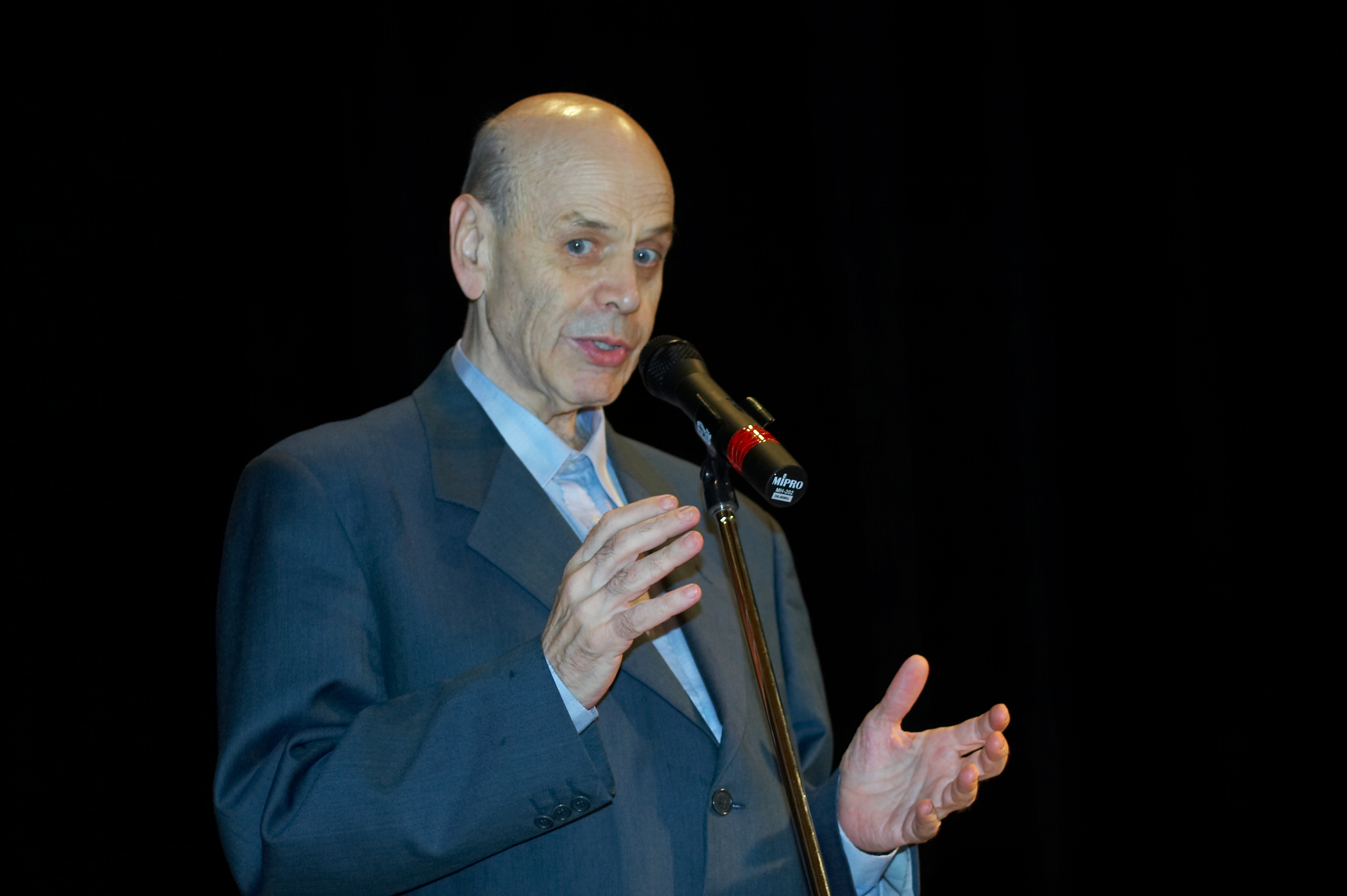
Portrait of Alexei Komech

Alexei Komech (8 August 1936 – 28 February 2007) was a Russian preservationist, architectural historian and art critic who helped protect the cultural heritage of Moscow and Saint Petersburg for over 50 years. He was the Director of the Moscow Art History Institute and a member of the Moscow's City Government's Architectural Consultative Council.

Komech commanded immense respect in the city of Moscow and often battled with the mayor, Yury Luzhkov, and local developers to save the city's architectural heritage from the "substitution of historic sites with modern reproductions and theatrical imitations." He also served on the board of the Open Society Institute–Russia

'The city is interested in receiving so much [from construction] that it pushes the architecture council to allow anything,' he said. 'It has allow[ed developers] to destroy, to start anew, to build underground garages at the price of the historical part of the city. ... It's all at the expense of the city's history'

== Publications ==
- Komech, Alexei (1991) The Golden Ring: Cities of Old Russia. ISBN 1-55859-216-4
- Gippenreiter, Vadim and Komech, Alexei (1991) Old Russian Cities. ISBN 1-85669-009-1
