= Brian Belle =

English cricketer

Personal information
- Full name: Brian Henry Belle
- Born: 7 April 1914; Woodford Green, Essex, England
- Died: 27 February 2007 (aged 92); Campsea Ashe, Suffolk, England
- Batting: Right-handed
- Role: Batsman

Domestic team information
- Years: Team
- 1935–1937: Essex
- 1935–1936: Oxford University Cricket Club

Career statistics
Competition	FC
Matches	43
Runs scored	1235
Batting average	18.43
100s/50s	0/5
Top score	70
Balls bowled	42
Wickets	1
Bowling average	33.00
5 wickets in innings	0
10 wickets in match	0
Best bowling	1/10
Catches/stumpings	30/–
- Source: Cricinfo, 24 December 2018

Brian Belle (7 April 1914 – 27 February 2007) was an English cricketer. He played first-class cricket for Essex between 1935 and 1937. At the time of his death he was the oldest surviving Essex player.

== Career ==
While studying at Keble College, Oxford, Belle appeared in two matches for Oxford University in 1935, then played a full season for them in 1936, winning his Blue. He usually batted in the middle order. Between 1935 and 1937 he also played regularly for Essex as an amateur. His highest first-class score was 70 for Oxford against Surrey in 1936, the highest score on either side, which enabled Oxford to gain a first-innings lead.

His first-class cricket career ended when he became a master at Orwell Park School near Ipswich in Suffolk. He began playing Minor County cricket for Suffolk in 1939. After serving in the Royal Artillery during the Second World War, he continued to play for Suffolk, helping them to their first title in 1946 and captaining them between 1949 and 1953. He played 92 matches for Suffolk, scoring 4459 runs at an average of 35.11, with a top score of 175 not out. He was subsequently county chairman, holding office when Suffolk won the championship in 1977 and 1979. He continued teaching at Orwell Park, serving as headmaster from 1969 until his retirement ten years later.

He also won a Blue at football in 1935-36 and played for the Corinthians as a full-back. He was also a talented golfer. He and his wife Sylvia (née Wilkinson) won the Suffolk Mixed Foursomes in 1966, and he served as president of the Suffolk Golf Union.
