= Judith Toups =

American ornithologist

Judith A. "Judy" Toups (November 30, 1930 – February 27, 2007) was a Mississippi-based birder and columnist for the Sun Herald of Biloxi for almost 35 years.

== Biography ==
Born and raised in Gloucester, Massachusetts, Toups met and married U.S. Navy sailor Emile Joseph Toups, a Mississippi native, in Gloucester, Massachusetts. She returned with him to his home state in 1965, the year he mustered out of the Navy. They settled in Gulfport, Mississippi and raised six children.

Her parents realized, on one of their visits to the Gulf Coast, that a stay-at-home mother of six young children needed a diversion. In the late 1980s, Toups rescued a sharp-shinned hawk from the front screened porch of a house in Bay St. Louis. The bird had barreled through the screen in pursuit of a squirrel and had been trapped on the porch, disoriented and unable to find the door and freedom. With only a quilt between her and sharp beak and talons, Toups dropped the bed covering over this formidable raptor, and ... carrying the trailing tails of the quilt, she carried the swaddled bird outside and let it go.

Toups founded the Mississippi Coast Audubon Society and advanced its conservation causes, including the high-profile protection program for terns and black skimmers. She sent fledgling birders out across Coast terrain in search of native and visiting birds. She developed the Mississippi Coastal Birding Trail map, and wrote two books on birding the Gulf Coast. There is a trail named after her in Jackson County's Ward Bayou, and she was honoured by many birding societies. A portion of U.S. Highway 90 in Gulfport bordering the nesting areas she sought to protect was renamed the Judith Toups Least Tern Highway in early 2008.

Following the devastation of Hurricane Katrina, Toups relocated to Decatur, Alabama, where she died, aged 76, from undisclosed causes, on February 27, 2007, aged 76.
