= Michael Hart (judge) =

British judge (1948–2007)

Sir Michael Christopher Campbell Hart (7 May 1948 – 20 February 2007) was a judge of the High Court of England and Wales in the Chancery Division.

Born in London, Hart was educated at Winchester College, where he was cox of the rowing eight, and read law at Magdalen College, Oxford. He graduated with a first-class degree in 1969, and then studied for the Bachelor of Civil Law. He took a second first, winning the Vinerian Prize and Scholarship for the best exam performance.

He was a Fellow of All Souls College, Oxford, from 1970 until his death, with three intermissions in 1977 to 1979, 1986 to 1993 and 1995 to 2001. He was called to the Bar at Gray's Inn in 1970, joining a Chancery chambers, practising in trust law, property law and revenue law.

He met his first wife, Melanie Sandiford, at Oxford, and they were married in 1972; they had two daughters. In 1996, he divorced his first wife, and married a second time, to Sara Jane Hargreaves, a barrister; they had a son.

He became a QC in 1987, and served as a deputy High Court judge from 1991. He became a QC in Northern Ireland in 1994.

He was appointed a judge in the Chancery Division on 21 April 1998, receiving the customary knighthood. He was Chancery Supervising Judge for the Midland, Western, and Wales and Chester circuits from 2004 to 2006.

He died of lung cancer, aged 58. He was survived by his second wife, their son, and his two daughters from his first marriage.
