= Jim Kennedy (cricketer) =

English cricketer

Personal information
- Full name: James Kennedy
- Born: 31 August 1932; Hartlepool, County Durham, England
- Died: 21 February 2007 (aged 74); Hartlepool, County Durham, England
- Batting: Left-handed
- Bowling: Slow left-arm orthodox

Domestic team information
- Years: Team
- 1966–1968: Durham

Career statistics
Competition	List A
Matches	2
Runs scored	28
Batting average	14.00
100s/50s	0/0
Top score	23
Catches/stumpings	0/–
- Source: Cricinfo, 7 August 2011

James Kennedy (31 August 1932 – 21 February 2007) was an English cricketer. A left-handed batsman who bowled slow left-arm orthodox, he played Minor counties and List A cricket for Durham between 1966 and 1968. He was born in Hartlepool, County Durham.

Kennedy made his debut for Durham against the Warwickshire Second XI in the 1966 Minor Counties Championship. He played Minor counties cricket for Durham from 1966 to 1968, making 17 Minor Counties Championship appearances. He made his List A debut against Nottinghamshire in the 1967 Gillette Cup. In this match, he scored 5 runs before being dismissed by Barry Stead. He made a further List A appearance against Worcestershire in the 1968 Gillette Cup. He was dismissed for 23 runs in this match by Brian Brain, with Worcestershire winning by 16 runs.

Kennedy died in Hartlepool on 21 February 2007, aged 74.
