= William Kurtz (photographer) =

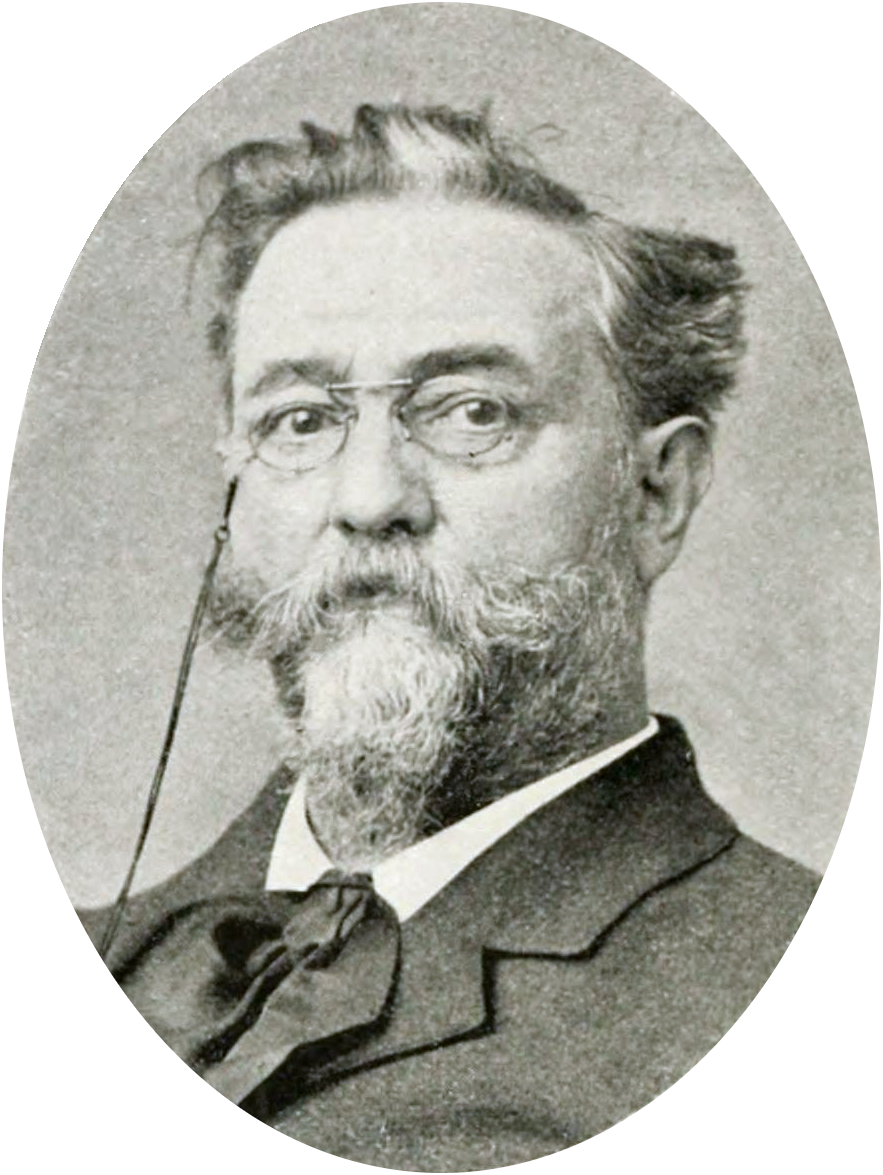
- Born: Wilhelm Kurz; 1833; Hesse, Germany
- Died: December 5, 1904 (aged 70–71); Far Rockaway, New York, U.S.

William Kurtz, born Wilhelm Kurz (1833 – December 5, 1904) was a German-American artist, illustrator, and photographer. He was also a pioneer in the development of halftone printing of color photographs.

== Early life ==
Born in Hesse, Germany, he was apprenticed to a lithographer in Offenbach am Main at a young age and showed considerable artistic talent, taking first place in exhibitions while attending an art school there. However, after his two years of compulsory military service, he found he had lost his apprenticeship and moved to England to try his luck. Unable to find work there, he joined the British German Legion and went to fight in the Crimean War.

After the war, he was still unable to gain employment as a lithographer, so he became a sailor for several years. In 1859, he decided he would travel to China with a friend. En route to San Francisco, his ship wrecked off the Falkland Islands. The passengers and crew were rescued and he was taken to New York City. Here, he was able to find work in a photography studio. When the American Civil War began, he enlisted in the New York Seventh Regiment and served with them intermittently over the course of the war.

In 1865, he entered into a partnership with fellow photographer George G. Rockwood, who was credited with popularizing the carte de visite in America. The next year he formed a studio with another partner, named Huston. The two of them practiced a technique called "photosculpture", which involved taking up to 24 simultaneous photographs of a subject from various angles to assist a sculptor to create a sculpture of that person. Finally in 1873, he established a studio on his own in Madison Square.

== Halftone pioneer ==
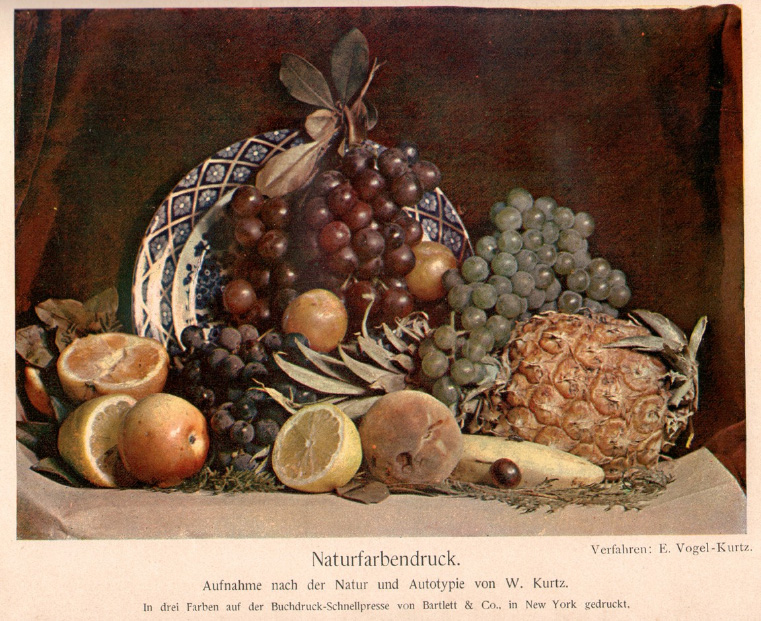
Still life of fruit, printed using the three-color process (January 1893)

Learning of Georg Meisenbach's success with halftone printing in England, Kurtz set out to reproduce the process and in doing so, became one of the United States' first commercial practitioners of reproducing photographic plates in halftone prints. This proved very profitable for him.

Likewise, when Hermann Wilhelm Vogel's advances in color photography became known, Kurtz arranged to purchase the American rights to the "three-color process" from Vogel and was able to devise a way to apply it to halftone printing. In doing so, he—in conjunction with Vogel's son Ernst—was able to produce superior results and drive the cost of color printing down dramatically, so much so that Vogel himself acknowledged that Kurtz's adaptations had improved on his own discoveries. Using this process, Kurtz made the first color images that were widely reproduced—a still life of fruit on a table—being published in the January 1, 1893, edition of Photographische Mittheilungen, a German photography journal published by Vogel. The same image was later published in the U.S. in the March 1893 issue of Engraver & Printer.

== Other photography innovations ==
Beginning in the 1860s, vignetted heads and upper torsos became a popular style of portrait photographs known as the "Rembrandt style". Kurtz perfected a process using a series of reflectors to concentrate and bounce sunlight onto the subject's face. With the subject seated against a dark background, the result emphasized strong features and masked weaker ones.

However, this technique was limited by daylight hours and weather. The winter months proved to be especially problematic (as demand for studio portraits happened to rise then), and Kurtz was one of the first people to use electric lighting to achieve the same effect.

== Later life ==
Kurtz spent the last years of his life in Far Rockaway, Queens. He had spent his summers there since 1879, and moved there permanently in 1899. He died at his home on December 5, 1904, from pneumonia. He was survived by his wife, four daughters, and three sons.
