= Robert Engler =

Robert Engler (July 12, 1922 – February 23, 2007) was an American professor emeritus of political science at the City University of New York (and other colleges and universities) and a writer of numerous essays and books on the subject. He was most outspoken regarding the Western world's dependence on oil, a subject on which he wrote two books, The Politics of Oil (1961) and The Brotherhood of Oil (1977). Engler also wrote numerous essays on an array of subjects for various journals and magazines.

Engler was born in the Bronx, New York City, United States to Jewish immigrants from eastern Europe. In 1942 he graduated from the City College of New York. He then served in the United States Army in World War IIand was among those involved in the liberation of Dachau.

After World War II with funding from the GI bill he graduated with a Ph.D. in government from the University of Wisconsin–Madison.

Initially Engler worked under James G. Patton at the National Farmers Union (United States) and then he joined the faculty of Sarah Lawrence College where he was for 18 years. Following which he joined the faculty of the City University of New York, where he worked at the Brooklyn College, Queens College and the Graduate Center.

Engler's The Politics of Oil was when published hailed as the first book to broadly look at the oil insterest from a standpoint of public interest in 24 years. Other reviewers criticized Engler's overall methods, and letting his desires drive him to call things "undemocratic" that in fact expressed the will of the only defined and vocal interests of the public that were easily discernible.

== Bibliography ==
- The Politics of Oil: A Study of Private Power and Democratic Directions. Chicago: University of Chicago Press. 1961. LCCN 61017192.
- The Brotherhood of Oil: Energy Policy and the Public Interest. Chicago: University of Chicago Press. 1977. ISBN 0-226-20948-2.
