= Loren Grey =

American novelist and educational psychologist (1915–2007)

Loren Grey (1915–2007; born Middletown, New York) was an American novelist and educational psychologist who attended the USC Rossier School of Education. He was the son of the writer Zane Grey.

== Lassiter novels ==
- Lassiter (1985)
- Ambush for Lassiter (1985)
- Lassiter Gold (1986)
- Lassiter Tough (1986)
- The Lassiter Luck (1986)
- A Grave for Lassiter (1987)
- Lassiter's Ride (1988)
- Lassiter on the Texas Trail (1988)
- Lassiter and the Great Horse Race (1989)
- Lassiter and the Golden Dragon (1989)
- Lassiter's Showdown (1990)
- Lassiter in the Comanche Stronghold (1990)
