= William Kurtz (field hockey) =

American hockey player

Personal information
- Born: December 18, 1917 Philadelphia, Pennsylvania, United States
- Died: February 16, 2007 (aged 89) Princeton, New Jersey, United States

Sport
- Sport: Field hockey

William Kurtz (December 18, 1917 – February 16, 2007) was an American field hockey player. He competed in the men's tournament at the 1948 Summer Olympics.
