= Kennedy (surname) =

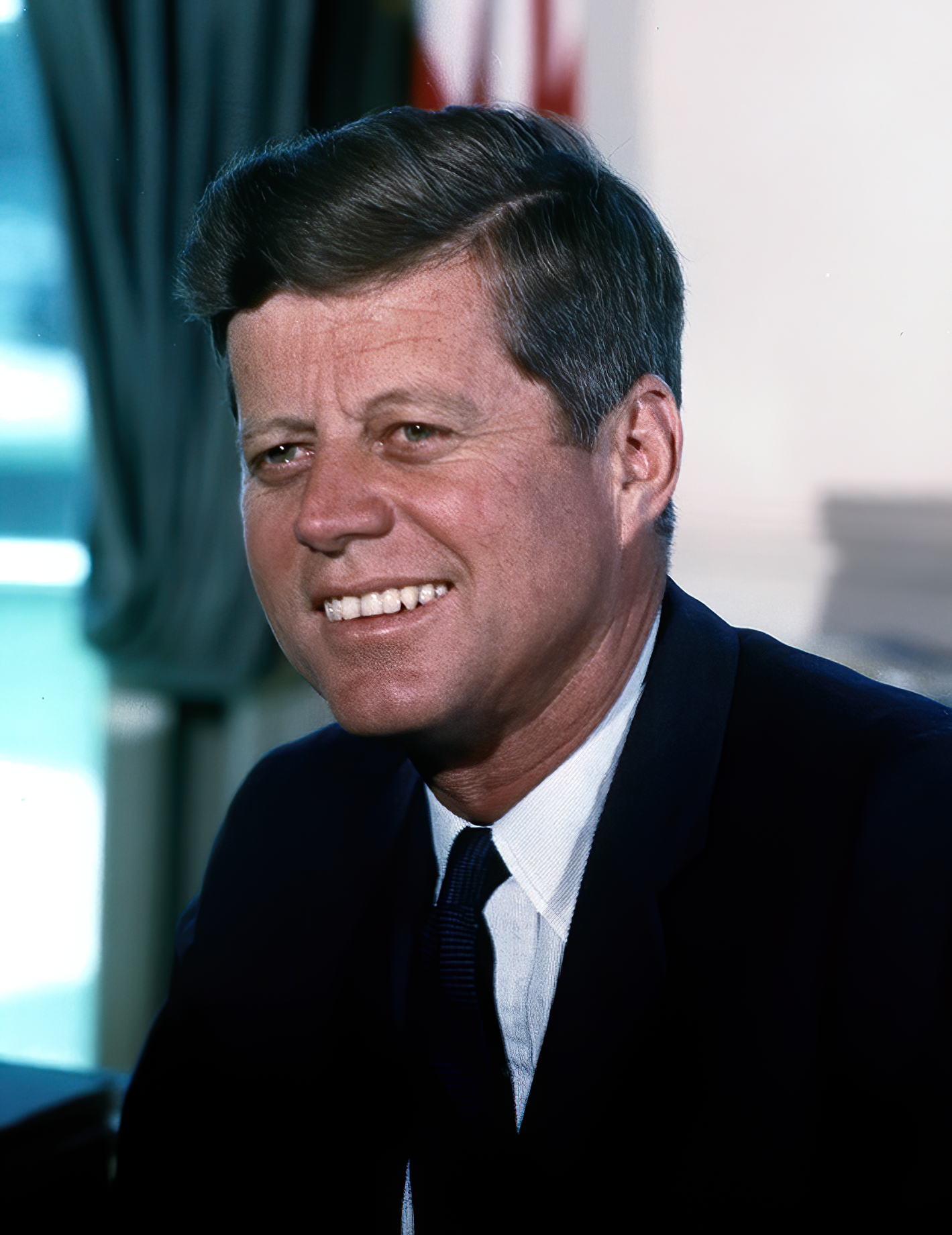
- John F. Kennedy's official portrait
- Pronunciation: /ˈkɛnədi/
- Language: Irish

Origin
- Meaning: Derived either from Ó Cinnéide meaning grandson of Cinnédidh, or "ceann" and "éidigh". "Ceann" comes from the Irish word meaning "chieftain" (a leader of a clan or tribe), and "éidigh" comes from the Irish word meaning "helmet". The name can be translated to mean "helmeted chief or leader".
- Region of origin: Ireland

Other names
- Related names: O'Kennedy and Kennedie

Kennedy, with variant forms O'Kennedy and Kennedie, is a surname and a given name of Irish and Scottish origins.

== Origins ==
There have been several etymologies given for the surname. One is that the name is an Anglicisation of Ó Cinnéide, which means "grandson of Cinnédidh" or "grandson of Cinnéidigh". Both of these personal names are derived from Irish words meaning "helmet-headed". Ceanéidigh could be related to the old Irish name Cennétig, which is known from Cennétig mac Lorcáin, the father of the Irish high king Brian mac Cennétig, who was also known as Brian Bóruma or Brian Boru. There is an Irish Kennedy family and a Scottish Kennedy clan in Carrick, Ayrshire, which are unrelated to one another.

Another possibility is that Kennedy is an Anglicisation of the Irish Ó Ceannéidigh, meaning "grandson of Ceannéidigh". Ceannéidigh is a given name derived from the Irish word ceann, meaning "head", and éidigh, meaning "ugly" or "fierce". Some etymologies also suggest that the element ceann could mean "chief" or "leader".

== Name lists ==
- Adam Kennedy, several people
- Alan Kennedy, several people
- Alex Kennedy, several people
- Alfred Kennedy, several people
- Andrew Kennedy, several people
- Andy Kennedy, several people
- Angus Kennedy, several people
- Ann Kennedy, several people
- Arthur Kennedy, several people
- Ben Kennedy, several people
- Bill Kennedy, several people
- Billy Kennedy, several people
- Brian Kennedy, several people
- Bryan Kennedy, several people
- Catherine Kennedy, several people
- Cathy Kennedy, several people
- Charles Kennedy, several people
- Chris Kennedy, several people
- Daniel Kennedy, several people
- David Kennedy, several people
- Donald Kennedy, several people
- Douglas Kennedy, several people
- Duncan Kennedy, several people
- Ed Kennedy, several people
- Edward Kennedy, several people
- Elizabeth Kennedy, several people
- Francis Kennedy, several people
- Gene Kennedy, several people
- George Kennedy, several people
- Grace Kennedy, several people
- Graham Kennedy, several people
- Greg Kennedy, several people
- Harrison Kennedy, several people
- Harry Kennedy, several people
- Henry Kennedy, several people
- Howard Kennedy, several people
- Hugh Kennedy, several people
- Ian Kennedy, several people
- Jack Kennedy, several people
- James Kennedy, several people
- Jamie Kennedy, several people
- Jason Kennedy, several people
- Joan Kennedy, several people
- John Kennedy, several people
- Joseph Kennedy, several people
- Kate Kennedy, several people
- Kathleen Kennedy, several people
- Les Kennedy, several people
- Margaret Kennedy, several people
- Marjorie Kennedy, several people
- Mark Kennedy, several people
- Martin Kennedy, several people
- Mary Kennedy, several people
- Matthew Kennedy, several people
- Maurice Kennedy, several people
- Michael Kennedy, several people
- Mick Kennedy, several people
- Norman Kennedy, several people
- Paddy Kennedy, several people
- Pat Kennedy, several people
- Patrick Kennedy, several people
- Paul Kennedy, several people
- Peter Kennedy, several people
- Philip Kennedy, several people
- Ralph Kennedy, several people
- Ray Kennedy, several people
- Richard Kennedy, several people
- Robert Kennedy, several people
- Ronald Kennedy, several people
- Rose Kennedy, several people
- Sam Kennedy, several people
- Sarah Kennedy, several people
- Scott Kennedy, several people
- Seamus Kennedy, several people
- Sean Kennedy, several people
- Stephen Kennedy, several people
- Ted Kennedy, several people
- Terry Kennedy, several people
- Thomas Kennedy, several people
- Timothy Kennedy, several people
- Walter Kennedy, several people
- William Kennedy, several people

== In arts and entertainment ==
- A. L. Kennedy (Alison Louise Kennedy, born 1965), Scottish novelist
- Adam Kennedy (actor) (1922–1997), American actor, screenwriter, novelist, painter
- Adam Kennedy (musician) (born 1986), Canadian musician and producer
- Alexis Kennedy (born 1972), British writer and game designer
- Andrew Karpati Kennedy (1931–2016), Hungarian-born British author, literary critic and academic
- Arthur Kennedy (1914–1990), American actor
- Bailey Anne Kennedy, Cambodian-American beauty pageant winner
- Betty Kennedy, retired Canadian senator, television personality
- Bill Kennedy (actor) (1908–1997), American actor and television personality
- Brian Kennedy (singer) (born 1966), Irish singer and songwriter
- Cory Kennedy (model), American Internet celebrity
- Darren Kennedy, Irish television presenter, fashion writer and stylist
- Dermot Kennedy (born 1992), Irish singer-songwriter
- Diane Kennedy (1923–2022), British food journalist
- Don Kennedy (1930-2023), American radio personality and voiceover
- Douglas Kennedy, UK-based American novelist
- Edgar Kennedy (1890–1948), American actor
- George Kennedy (1925–2016), American actor
- Gerard Kennedy (actor) (1932–2025), Australian actor
- Graeme K. (Graeme Kennedy), American musician
- Graham Kennedy, Australian comedian and television presenter
- Harrison Kennedy (musician) (born 1942), Canadian blues, R&B, and soul blues musician
- Jamie Kennedy, American comedian and actor
- Jane Kennedy (actress) (born 1964), Australian actress
- Jerry Kennedy (1940–2026), American record producer, songwriter and guitar player
- Kathleen Kennedy (producer) (born 1953), American film producer
- Lena Kennedy, English romantic novelist
- Leon S. Kennedy, frequent character in the Resident Evil franchise
- Les Kennedy (journalist) (1958–2011), Australian journalist
- Lisa Kennedy Montgomery (born 1972), stage name Kennedy, American political satirist and former MTV VJ
- Liza Kennedy (born 1989), Japanese model
- Louise Kennedy (writer) (born 1967), Irish writer
- Lucy Napaljarri Kennedy, Indigenous Australian artist
- Ludovic Kennedy, British journalist, broadcaster, and author
- Margaret Kennedy (1896–1967), English novelist
- Martha Kennedy (born 1951), American curator at the Library of Congress
- Mary Kennedy, Irish television personality
- Merna Kennedy (1908–1944), American actress
- Michael Kennedy (1926–2014), English music critic
- Mr. Kennedy, the ring name used by American professional wrestler Ken Anderson (born 1976) during his time in WWE
- Mimi Kennedy (born 1948), American actress, author, and activist
- Myles Kennedy (born 1969), American rock singer and guitarist
- Nigel Kennedy, English violinist
- Patrick Kennedy, British theatre director
- Rann Kennedy (1772–1851), English schoolteacher, church minister and poet
- Richard Kennedy (author) (1932–2025), American children's book writer
- Roisin Kennedy, Irish art critic and curator
- Sara Beaumont Kennedy (1859–1920), American writer and newspaper editor
- Sarah Kennedy (born 1950), British television and radio broadcaster
- Sean J. Kennedy, American drumset player, percussionist, author and educator
- Sheila Kennedy, American model and actress, Penthouse model in the early 1980s
- Sheila Kennedy (architect), American architect
- Tom Kennedy (television host) (1927–2020), stage name of American game show host James Narz
- Tully Kennedy, bass guitarist, Jason Aldean band
- William Kennedy (author) (born 1928), American writer and journalist
- X. J. Kennedy (1929–2026), American poet, translator, anthologist, editor, and author
- The Four Mortons, American vaudeville family originally named Kennedy

== In politics and government ==
=== Members of the American Kennedy political family ===
- Caroline Kennedy (born 1957), American author, attorney and diplomat; daughter of John and Jacqueline Kennedy; married to Edwin Schlossberg and mother of three
- Carolyn Bessette Kennedy (1966–1999), born Carolyn Jeanne Bessette, American fashion publicist and wife of John F. Kennedy Jr.
- Edward M. "Ted" Kennedy (1932–2009), senior US senator from Massachusetts, married twice and father of three
- Edward M. "Ted" Kennedy Jr. (born 1961), state senator from Connecticut, son of Ted Kennedy
- Ethel Kennedy (1928–2024), born Ethel Skakel, widow of Robert Francis Kennedy and mother of Kathleen Hartington Kennedy Townsend, Joseph Patrick Kennedy II, Robert Francis Kennedy Jr., Mary Kerry Kennedy, and other seven
- Eunice Kennedy Shriver (1921–2009), born Eunice Mary Kennedy, Special Olympics founder and sister of President John F. Kennedy; married to Robert Sargent Shriver Jr. and mother of five children with Robert
- Jacqueline Kennedy Onassis (1929–1994), born Jacqueline Lee Bouvier, First Lady of the United States; widow of John F. Kennedy and member of the Bouvier family
- Jean Kennedy Smith (1928–2020), born Jean Ann Kennedy, ambassador to Ireland; youngest sister of President John F. Kennedy, married to Stephen Edward Smith and mother of four
- Joan Bennett Kennedy (1936–2025), born Virginia Joan Bennett, first wife of Edward Moore Kennedy, mother of three
- John F. "Jack" Kennedy (1917–1963), 35th president of the United States from 1961 to 1963
- John F. Kennedy Jr. (1960–1999), attorney, publisher; son of John and Jacqueline
- Joseph P. "Joe" Kennedy Sr. (1888–1969), Kennedy family patriarch, ambassador to the United Kingdom; and father of President John F. Kennedy
- Joseph P. Kennedy Jr. (1915–1944), WWII pilot; eldest son of Joseph P. Kennedy Sr.
- Joseph P. Kennedy II (born 1952), US representative from Massachusetts; eldest son of Robert F. Kennedy
- Joseph P. "Joe" Kennedy III (born 1980), US representative from Massachusetts; son of Joseph P. Kennedy II
- Kathleen Cavendish, Marchioness of Hartington (1920–1948), born Kathleen Agnes Kennedy, widow of the heir to the Devonshire dukedom; younger sister of President John F. Kennedy
- Kathleen Kennedy Townsend (born 1951), born Kathleen Hartington Kennedy, lieutenant governor of Maryland; eldest daughter of Robert F. Kennedy
- Kerry Kennedy (born 1959), born Mary Kerry Kennedy, lawyer, human rights activist; daughter of Robert F. Kennedy, previously married to Andrew Cuomo and mother of three
- Mary Richardson Kennedy (1959–2012), born Mary Kathleen Richardson, architect; and second wife of Robert F. Kennedy Jr. and mother of four
- Patricia Kennedy Lawford (1924–2006), born Patricia Helen Kennedy, younger sister of President John F. Kennedy, previously married to Peter Lawford and mother of four
- Patrick J. Kennedy (born 1967), US representative from Rhode Island, son of Ted Kennedy
- P. J. Kennedy (1858–1929), state senator from Massachusetts, father of Joseph P. Kennedy Sr.
- Robert F. Kennedy (1925–1968), US senator from New York; US Attorney General
- Robert F. Kennedy Jr. (born 1954), attorney, environmentalist, activist; and son of Robert F. Kennedy
- Rose Kennedy (1890–1995), born Rose Elizabeth Fitzgerald, Kennedy family matriarch; mother of President John F. Kennedy
- Rosemary Kennedy (1918–2005), born Rose Marie Kennedy, eldest daughter of Joseph P. Kennedy Sr.

=== Other Kennedys involved in politics ===
- Alfred J. Kennedy (1877–1944), New York politician
- Ambrose Jerome Kennedy (1893–1950), American politician
- Annie Brown Kennedy, American politician
- Anthony Kennedy, US Supreme Court Associate Justice
- Arthur Kennedy, British colonial administrator
- Bela E. Kennedy (1918–2008), Michigan state legislator
- Betty Kennedy, retired Canadian senator, television personality
- Cary Kennedy, Colorado politician
- Charles Kennedy (1959–2015), Scottish politician, leader of the Liberal Democrats
- Claudia J. Kennedy, first female lieutenant general in the US Army, noted intelligence officer
- David Kennedy (Australian politician) (born 1940), Australian politician
- David M. Kennedy (politician), 60th Secretary of the Treasury of the United States of America, and US Ambassador to NATO
- Edward J. Kennedy (1951–2025), American politician
- Edward Joseph Kennedy (1851–?), Irish nationalist politician, Member of Parliament for South Sligo
- Eleanora Kennedy (fl. 1990's–2020's), American business woman, activist, and Ireland-based racehorse owner, wife of Michael John Kennedy
- Gerard Kennedy, Canadian politician
- Helena Kennedy, Baroness Kennedy of The Shaws, Scottish barrister, writer and politician
- Hiram Raleigh Kennedy, American politician
- John Neely Kennedy, Louisiana United States Senator and Republican politician
- John Pendleton Kennedy (1795–1870), Maryland author and politician, Secretary of the Navy in the Filmore administration
- Judy Kennedy, New York state politician
- Leland T. Kennedy, US Air Force pilot twice awarded the Air Force Cross
- Mark Kennedy, American politician
- Mark Kennedy (police officer), British undercover policeman
- Michael John Kennedy, (1937–2016), American criminal defense attorney, expert in U.S. Constitutional law, and a civil rights advocate, husband of Eleanora
- Neil Kennedy, Lord Kennedy (1854–1918), Scottish advocate and legal academic, Chairman of the Scottish Land Court 1912–18
- Nigel Kennedy (politician) (1889–1964), British barrister, army officer and politician
- Ricardo Kennedy (1867–1938), Argentine politician
- Sir Paul Kennedy, British judge
- Seema Kennedy (born 1974), British Conservative Party politician, Member of Parliament (MP) for South Ribble since May 2015
- Sheryl Kennedy, American politician
- Thomas Laird Kennedy, Premier of Ontario (1948–1949)
- Vincent P. Kennedy (1824–1903), American physician and politician
- Sir William Rann Kennedy, British judge (1846–1915)
- Willie B. Kennedy (1923–2013), member of the San Francisco Board of Supervisors and member of the BART Board of Directors
- Christian Farquharson-Kennedy (1870–1917), Scottish teacher, socialist and suffragist

== In sports ==
- Adam Kennedy (born 1976), American professional baseball player
- Alan Kennedy (born 1954), English footballer
- Alanna Kennedy (born 1995), Australian association footballer
- Allan Kennedy (born 1958), Canadian-born American football player
- Andrew Kennedy (born 1965), American-Jamaican basketball player, 1996 Israeli Basketball Premier League MVP
- Barbara Kennedy (1960–2018), American basketball player
- Ben Kennedy, Australian rugby league footballer
- Bob Kennedy (1920–2005), Major League Baseball player and manager
- Bob Kennedy (1921–2010), American football player
- Bob Kennedy (1928–1991), American football player
- Bob Kennedy (runner) (born 1970), American distance runner
- Brad Kennedy (born 1974), Australian golfer
- Buddy Kennedy (born 1998), American baseball player
- Callum Kennedy, English footballer
- Carlos Kennedy (born 1911), Argentine swimmer
- Casey Kennedy (born 1991), American professional golfer
- Clem Kennedy, Australian rugby league footballer
- Cortez Kennedy (1968–2017), American football player
- Cory Kennedy (skateboarder), American professional skateboarder
- Courtney Kennedy (1979), American dual Olympic medal winner in women's ice hockey
- Dave Kennedy (footballer) (born 1949), English footballer
- David Kennedy (racing driver) (born 1953), Irish racing driver
- Dean Kennedy (born 1963), Canadian ice hockey player
- Edward Shirley Kennedy, British alpinist
- Fred Kennedy (1902–1963), English football player
- Gilbert G. Kennedy (1844–1909), Scottish footballer
- Goo Kennedy (1949–2020), American basketball player
- Ian Kennedy (born 1984), American baseball player
- Jeremy Kennedy, UFC Fighter
- Jerry Kennedy (cricketer) (born 1938), South African cricketer
- Jim Kennedy, American baseball player, brother of Junior Kennedy
- Jon Kennedy (born 1995), Australian professional baseball player
- Joshua Kennedy, Australian soccer player
- Junior Kennedy, American baseball player, brother of Jim Kennedy
- Kenneth Kennedy, the first Winter Olympian for Australia
- Kevin Kennedy (baseball) (born 1954), American baseball manager and broadcaster
- Marcus Kennedy, American basketball player
- Mark Kennedy, Irish football (soccer) player
- Mick Kennedy (disambiguation), several sports people
- Mike Kennedy, American college baseball coach
- Neil Kennedy-Cochran-Patrick (1926–1994), British Olympic sailor
- Nery Kennedy, Paraguayan javelin thrower
- Nick Kennedy, English rugby player
- Pat Kennedy (coach), American college basketball coach
- Patrick Kennedy (swimmer) (born 1964), American swimmer
- Ray Kennedy (1951–2021), English footballer
- Ron Kennedy (1953–2009), Canadian ice hockey player
- Ryan Kennedy (born 1982), Canadian actor and model
- Stewart Kennedy (born 1946), Scottish Football Player
- Ted Kennedy (ice hockey) (1925–2009), Canadian ice hockey player
- Ted Kennedy (racing driver) (born 1955), American racing driver
- Tim Kennedy, American mixed martial arts fighter
- Tim Kennedy, American ice hockey player

== In other fields ==
- Adrian Kennedy, Irish radio host
- Alexander Kennedy, British civil engineer
- Annie Kennedy, American educator
- Becky Kennedy, American clinical psychologist and writer
- Benjamin Hall Kennedy, English classical scholar
- Bernard Kennedy, Irish psychoanalyst, poet, and priest
- Betty Ann Kennedy, American bridge player
- D. James Kennedy, American Presbyterian pastor and theologian
- Diane Kennedy, American CPA, speaker, financial writer
- Donald Kennedy, American scientist, public administrator, and academic
- Duncan Kennedy, Carter Professor of General Jurisprudence, Harvard Law School
- Edmund Kennedy (1818–1848), Australian explorer
- Edmund P. Kennedy (1785–1844), officer in United States Navy
- Edward Kennedy (c. 1905–1963), American journalist who first reported the German surrender in World War II
- Edward Stewart Kennedy (1912–2009), American historian of science
- Eugene P. Kennedy (1919–2011), American biochemist
- George Clayton Kennedy (1919–1980), American botanist
- George Golding Kennedy (1841–1918), American botanist
- Gillian Dorothy Kennedy, British speech and language therapist
- Ian Kennedy, Irish landscape architect
- Inga Kennedy (born 1962), Scottish nurse and senior Royal Navy officer
- Irving Farmer Kennedy (1922–2011), Canadian fighter pilot
- Isola Kennedy (1871–1909), American woman who died after fighting a mountain lion
- Jennie E. Kennedy, American suffragist
- Joseph W. Kennedy, American physicist
- Jonny Kennedy, subject of the documentary The Boy Whose Skin Fell Off
- Julia Kennedy, British classical scholar
- Julian Kennedy, American engineer and inventor
- Kathryn Kennedy, California wine maker
- Margrit Kennedy, German architect and author
- Marion Kennedy, British classical scholar
- Marvin G. Kennedy, United States Navy submarine commander in World War II
- Myles Burton Kennedy, Furness ironmaster
- Paul Kennedy, British historian of international relations
- Rita Shugart, née Kennedy, American bridge player
- Robert Cobb Kennedy (1835–1865), Confederate operative who attempted to burn down New York City
- Stanislaus Kennedy (1939–2025), Irish Roman Catholic nun and social activist
- Stetson Kennedy (1916–2011), American human rights activist and folklore collector
- Thomas Francis Kennedy (bishop) (1858–1917), American Catholic archbishop
- William Kennedy-Cochran-Patrick (1896–1933), Scottish flying ace

== See also ==
- Clan Kennedy of Scotland
- Marquess of Ailsa, held by the chief of the Clan Kennedy
- Kennedy (given name)
- Kennedy (disambiguation)
- Jasmine Kennedie
- O'Kennedy
