= Daniel Kennedy =

Daniel Kennedy may refer to:

- Daniel Kennedy (actor), American actor
- Daniel Kennedy (Manitoba judge), judge and former politician in Manitoba, Canada
- Dan Kennedy (author), American author and performer
- Dan Kennedy (soccer) (born 1982), American goalkeeper
- Dan Kennedy (hurler, born 1925) (1925–1976), Irish hurler from County Kilkenny
- Dan Kennedy (1900s hurler), Irish sportsperson who played hurling with Kilkenny
- Dan Kennedy (politician), Republican member of the Montana Legislature
- Danny Kennedy (politician) (born 1959), Unionist politician in Northern Ireland
- Danny Kennedy (environmentalist) (born 1971), clean-technology entrepreneur and environmental activist
- Danny Kennedy (speedway rider) (1958–1993), Australian motorcycle speedway rider

== See also ==
- Daniel Kenedy (born 1974), Portuguese footballer
