= Mick Kennedy (disambiguation) =

Mick Kennedy may refer to:

- Mick Kennedy (1961–2019), English footballer
- Mick Kennedy (Dublin hurler) (1935–2025), Irish hurler and Gaelic footballer
- Mick Kennedy (Limerick hurler) (1911–1977)
- Mick Kennedy (Offaly hurler), active 1975–1981
- Mick Kennedy (Gaelic footballer) (born 1958), Irish Gaelic footballer

== See also ==
- Michael Kennedy (disambiguation)
