= Kennedy (given name) =

Given name

- Cinnéididh and Cinnéidigh in a Gaelic type. Note the lenited g and d in the names (gh, dh) once appeared in Irish orthography with a dot above them.
- Pronunciation: /ˈkɛnɪdi/
- Gender: Unisex
- Language: English

Origin
- Language: Irish Gaelic
- Origin: Kennedy (surname)
- Region of origin: Ireland

Other names
- Variant forms: Kennedie; Kennedi; Kenedi
- Short form: Ken
- Related names: Kenny, Cassidy
- See also: Kennedy (surname)

Kennedy (also spelled Kenedi, Kennedie, Kennedi) (/ˈkɛnɪdi/) is a unisex given name in the English language. The name is an Anglicised form of a masculine given name in the Irish language.

== Etymology ==
The given name Kennedy is an anglicisation of Cinnéidigh, a masculine given name in the Irish language. This Irish name is composed of two elements: the first, ceann "head"; the second, éidigh "ugly". According to Patrick Woulfe, who wrote in the early 19th century, Kennedy is an anglicised form the Irish Cinnéididh and Cinnéidigh. Woulfe derived these Irish names from two elements: the first, ceann, meaning "a head"; the second, éide, meaning "armour"; hence the name can be thought to mean "helmet-headed".

== Other languages ==
As a masculine given name, Kennedy can be rendered into Irish as Cinnéididh and Cinnéidigh, and into Latin as Kinnedius. The masculine Kennedy can be rendered into Scottish Gaelic as Uarraig. This name is etymologically unrelated to the English Kennedy and Irish Cinnéidigh. Uarraig is composed of two Scottish Gaelic elements: the first, uall, means "pride"; and the second, garg, means "fierce". This Scottish Gaelic name is Anglicised Kennedy possibly because it was commonly borne by various families who bore the surname Kennedy. One such family, according tradition dating from the 18th century, descended from a man who bore a form of this name, and settled in Lochaber in the 16th century.

== Popularity and use ==
The name Kennedy has been in occasional use as a given name for both men and women since the 1800s throughout the Anglosphere. The name came into greater use during the 1960s in honor of John F. Kennedy, the 35th President of the United States, who was assassinated in 1963, and his brother Robert F. Kennedy, who was assassinated in 1968. As a name for girls, Kennedy was popularized by the fame of MTV video jockey Lisa Kennedy Montgomery. Spelling variants such as Kennedi and Kenadee also became popular for girls.

In the United States of America, Kennedy, has been among the top 1,000 names recorded in Social Security card applications, in the last 10 years, for both baby boys and girls. As a masculine name, Kennedy first appeared amongst the top 1,000 names in 1960, but fell out of the top 1,000 after 1968. The name did not re-enter the top 1,000 until 1994, where it stayed until 2005. At its height, Kennedy was ranked the 516th most popular masculine baby name in 1964. As a feminine name, Kennedy first appeared among the top 1,000 names in 1994 and among the 100 most popular names for American girls since 2011. In 1990, the United States Census Bureau undertook a study of the 1990 United States census, and released a sample of data concerning the most popular names. According to this sample of 6.3 million people (who had 5,494 unique first names), Kennedy did not even appear among the 4,275 feminine names, or the 1,219 masculine names.

=== Popularity charts ===
Popularity of Kennedy as a masculine name

Popularity of Kennedy as a feminine name

The years and rank when Kennedy appeared amongst the top 1,000 names for Social Security card applications concerning male and female births in the United States of America.

== Notable men ==
- Kennedy (musician) Jack Kennedy, California musician
- Kennedy Agyapong (born 1960), Ghanaian politician and businessman
- Ken Anderson (wrestler) (born 1976), known professionally as Mr. Kennedy, American professional wrestler
- Kennedy Ashia (born 1993), Ghanaian professional football player
- Kennedy Bakircioglu (born 1980), Swedish former football player
- Kennedy Asamoah Boateng (born 1989), Ghanaian professional football player
- Kennedy Kofi Boateng (born 1993), Ghanaian professional football player
- Kennedy Brooks (born 1998), American football player
- Kennedy Francis Burns (1842–1895), Canadian politician and businessman
- Kennedy Chandler (born 2002), American basketball player
- Kennedy Chihuri (born 1969), Zimbabwean former football player
- Reuben Asberry Jr., professionally known as Kennedy Davenport, American drag queen
- Kennedy Edwin (born 1976), Malaysian musician
- Kennedy Eriba (born 1990), Nigerian professional football player
- Kennedy William Gordy (born 1964), professionally known as Rockwell, American former singer
- Kennedy Graham (born 1946), New Zealand politician
- Kennedy Hinkson (born 1986), Trinidad and Tobago professional football player
- Kennedy Igboananike (born 1989), Nigerian professional football player
- Kennedy Ihenacho (born 1990), Nigerian professional football player
- Kennedy Izuka, American soccer player
- Kennedy Jones (journalist) (1865–1921), British journalist
- Kennedy Jones (musician) (1900–1990), American musician
- Kennedy Musyoka Kalonzo (born 1987), Kenyan politician and lawyer
- Kennedy Kanyanta (born 1979), Zambian professional boxer
- Kennedy Katende (born 1985), Ugandan-Swedish amateur boxer
- Kennedy Kimwetich (born 1973), Kenyan former runner
- Kennedy Kithuka (born 1989), Kenyan-American runner
- Kennedy Lindsay (1927–1997), British politician
- Kennedy Macdonald (1847–1914), New Zealand politician
- Kennedy Malunga (born 1970), Malawian professional football player
- Kennedy McArthur (1881–1960), known as Ken McArthur, Irish track and field athlete
- Kennedy McIntosh (1949–2009), American professional basketball player
- Kennedy McKinney (born 1966), American former professional boxer
- Kennedy Meeks (born 1995), American professional basketball player
- Kennedy Moretti (born 1966), Brazilian pianist
- Kennedy Mudenda (born 1988), Zambian professional football player
- Kennedy Mweene (born 1984), Zambian professional football player
- Kennedy Nagoli (born 1973), Zimbabwean former professional football player
- Kennedy Njiru (1987-2020), Kenyan steeplechase runner
- Kennedy Nketani (born 1984), Zambian professional football player
- Kennedy Nkeyasen (born 1976), Ghanaian former professional soccer player
- Kennedy Ugoala Nwanganga (born 1990), Nigerian professional football player
- Kennedy Osei Nyarko (born 1979), Ghanaian politician
- Kennedy Ochieng (born 1971), Kenyan former sprinter
- Kennedy Odede, Kenyan entrepreneur
- Kennedy Mong'are Okong'o (born 1969), Kenyan politician
- Kennedy Okonkwo (born 1977), Nigerian businessman
- Kennedy Okpala (born 2004), German footballer
- Kennedy Omogi (born 1983)
- Kennedy Ondiek (1966–2011), Kenyan runner
- Kennedy J. P. Orton (1872–1930), British chemist
- Kennedy Osei (born 1966), Ghanaian former runner
- Kennedy Otieno (born 1972), Kenyan former professional cricketer
- Kennedy Polamalu (born 1963), American football coach and former college football player
- Kennedy J. Reed, American physicist
- Kennedy Russell (1883–1954), British composer
- Kennedy Simmonds (born 1936), Saint Kitts and Nevis politician
- Kennedy St-Pierre (born 1992), Mauritian professional boxer
- Kennedy Stewart (Canadian politician) (born 1966), Canadian politician
- Kennedy Stewart (Irish politician) (1882–1964), Irish politician
- Kennedy Swaratsingh, Trinidad and Tobago politician
- Kennedy Thomson (1936–1996), British television presenter
- Kennedy Trevaskis (1915–1990), British colonial official and army officer
- Kennedy Tsimba (born 1974), South African professional rugby coach and former player
- Kennedy Urlacher (born 2005), American football player
- Kennedy Venkersammy (born 1951), Guyanese former professional cricketer
- Kennedy John Victor (born 1966), professionally known as Vikram, Indian actor
- Kennedy Winston (born 1984), American professional basketball player
- Kennedy Wong (born 1963), Hong Kong solicitor

== Notable women ==
- Kennedy Baker (born 1996), American collegiate and artistic gymnast
- Kennedy Bell (born 2005), American soccer player
- Kennedy Blades (born 2003), American wrestler
- Kennedy Burke (born 1997), American professional basketball player
- Kennedy Cherrington (born 1999), Australian rugby league and rugby union footballer
- Kennedy Faulknor (born 1999), Canadian soccer player
- Kennedy Fraser (born 1948), American writer
- Kennedy Fuller (born 2007), American professional soccer player
- Kennedy Goss (born 1996), Canadian competitive swimmer
- Kennedy Holmes, American singer
- Kennedy S Johnson, Ghanaian politician
- Kennedy Lewis (born 1991), American professional wrestling referee and professional wrestler
- Kennedy Marchment (born 1996), Canadian professional ice hockey player
- Kennedy McMann (born 1996), American actress
- Lisa Kennedy Montgomery (born 1972), known mononymously as Kennedy, American political commentator
- Kennedy Moore, American politician
- Kennedy Noble (born 2004), American swimmer
- Kennedy Reid, American singer
- Kennedy Ring (born 2007), American soccer player
- Kennedy Ryan, American romance novelist
- Kennedy Simon (born 1996), New Zealand rugby union player
- Kennedy Simon (sprinter) (born 2000), American athlete
- Kennedy Smith (born 2006), American basketball player
- Kennedy Summers (born 1987), American model and actress
- Kennedy Ashlyn Wenning, American musician under the alias SRSQ
- Kennedy Wesley (born 2001), American soccer player
- Kennedy White (born 2000), American professional soccer player
- Kennedy Yanko (born 1988), American sculptor, painter and installation artist

== See also ==
- List of Irish-language given names
