= Ruby chocolate =

Variety of chocolate

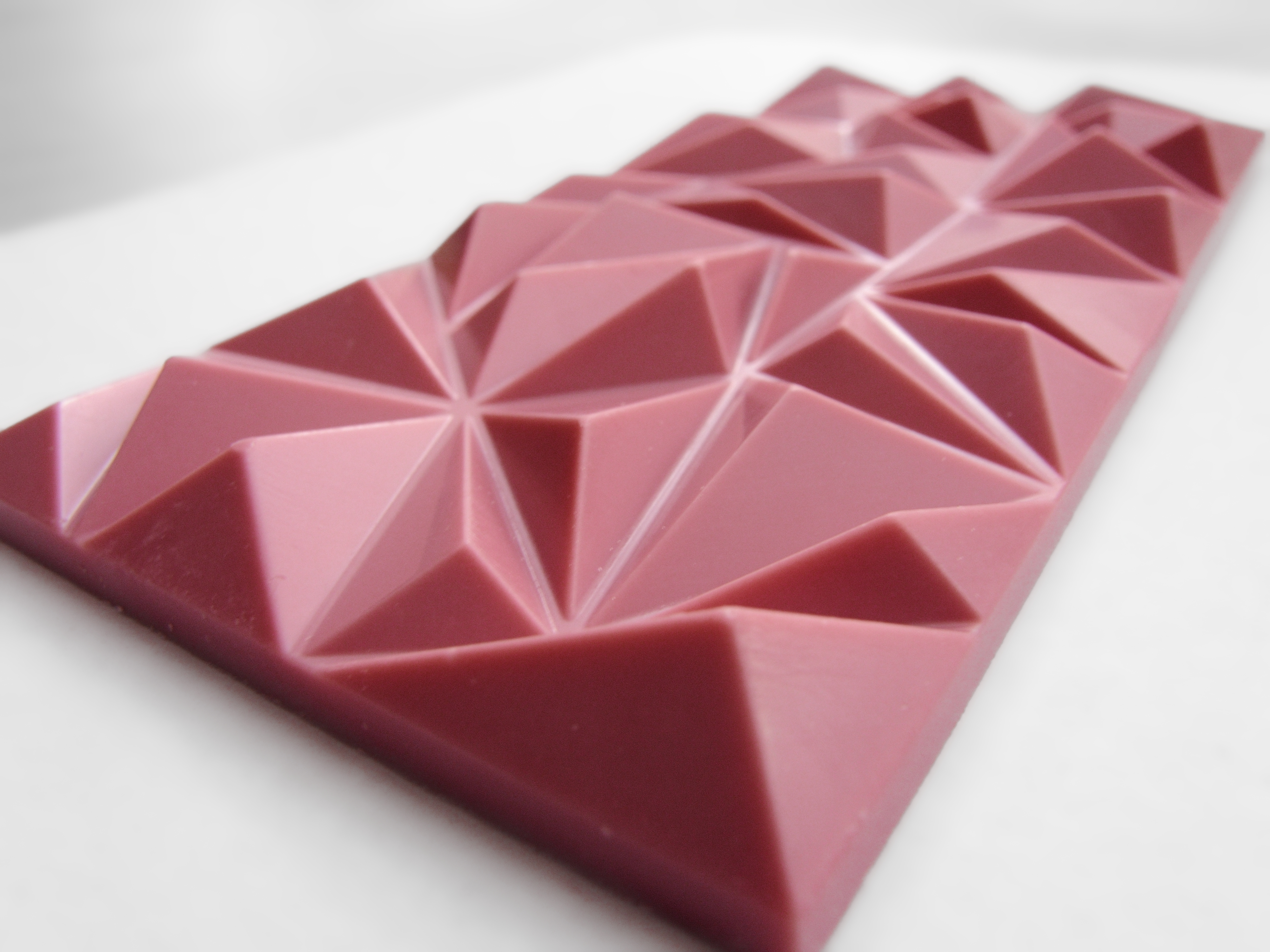
- An 80-gram bar of ruby chocolate
- Type: Chocolate
- Place of origin: Belgium
- Created by: Barry Callebaut
- Main ingredients: Cocoa butter; Cocoa mass; Milk; Sugar; Citric acid

Ruby chocolate is a variety of chocolate that is pink or purple in color. Barry Callebaut, a Belgian–Swiss cocoa company, introduced it as a distinct product on 5 September 2017 after beginning development of the product in 2004. While Barry Callebaut says it is a fourth natural type of chocolate (in addition to dark, milk, and white chocolate varieties), industry experts have debated whether this is true or a marketing claim.

== Composition ==
According to a temporary marketing permit granted by the Food and Drug Administration in the United States in 2019, ruby chocolate is defined as:

The solid or semiplastic food prepared by mixing and grinding cacao fat with one or more of the cacao ingredients (namely, chocolate liquor, breakfast cocoa, cocoa and lowfat cocoa), citric acid, one or more of optional dairy ingredients, and one or more optional nutritive carbohydrate sweeteners.

It must also contain a minimum of 1.5% nonfat cacao solids and a minimum of 20% by weight of cacao fat. Under the permit, the product does not contain added coloring and although it may contain antioxidants, spices, and other natural and artificial flavorings, these ingredients cannot mimic the flavors of chocolate, milk, butter, berries, or other fruit. The FDA said the product meets "most of the current standards for cacao products", but "deviates from the current standards of identity for chocolate products in terms of its final composition, taste, and color".

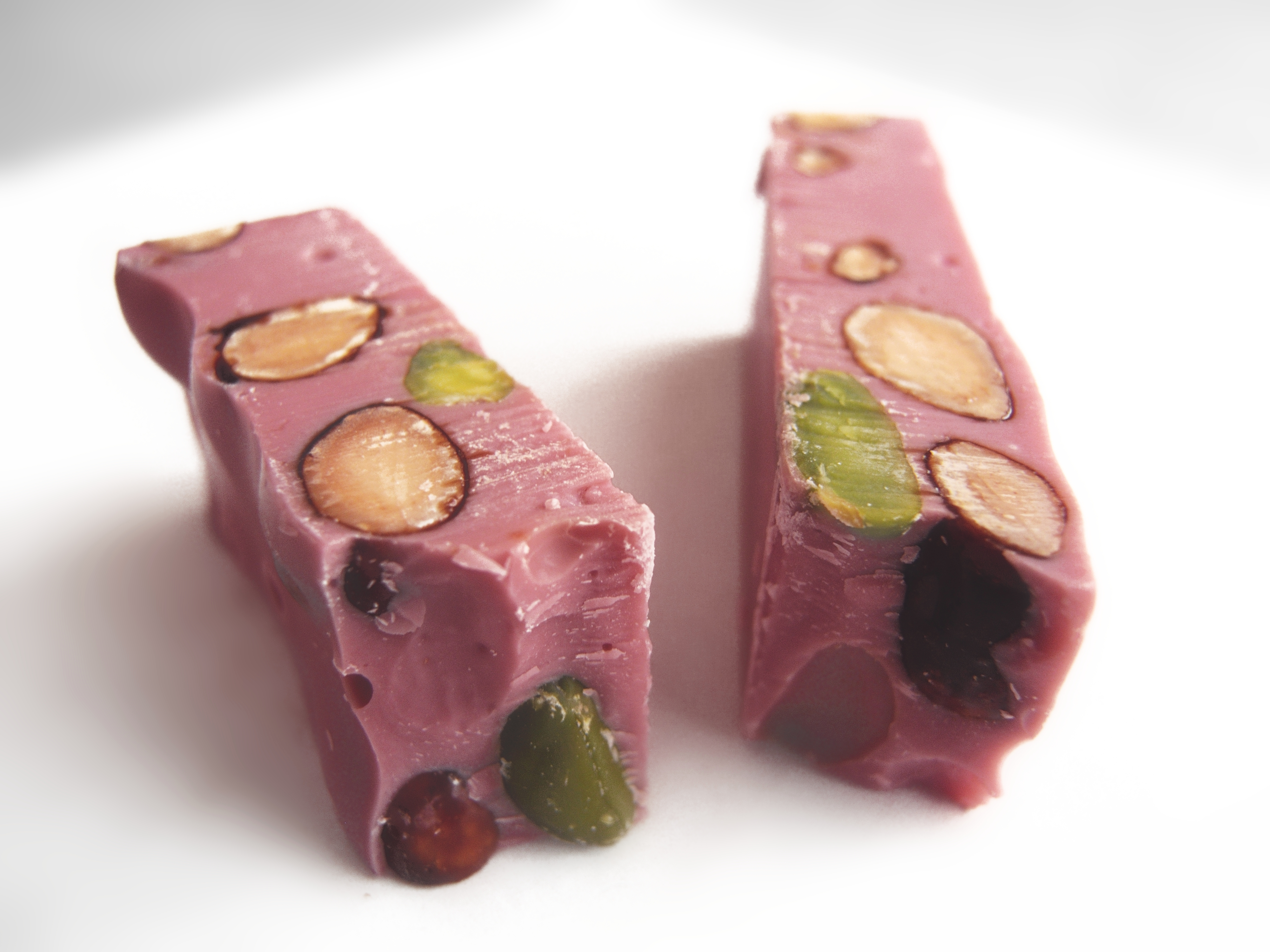
A broken ruby bar with caramelised almonds and pistachios

The chocolate is made from "ruby cocoa beans". These are existing botanical cocoa bean varieties that have been identified as having the right attributes to be processed into ruby chocolate. While the exact production method is a trade secret, publications note industry speculation is that ruby chocolate is made with unfermented cocoa beans of Brazil Lavados, which can have a natural red-pink color. Barry Callebaut filed a European patent application in 2010 for "cocoa-derived material" from unfermented cocoa beans (or beans fermented for no more than three days) that become red or purple after treating them with an acid, such as citric acid, and then defatting with petroleum ether or probably with CO_{2}.

In a comparison of the phenolic content between varieties of chocolate, ruby chocolate was rated between milk and white chocolate.

== Reception ==
It has been debated by chocolate experts whether ruby chocolate constitutes a new variety of chocolate or if it is a marketing strategy. Chocolate expert Clay Gordon stated that ruby chocolate could become as diverse as white chocolate. Angus Kennedy disputes that ruby chocolate is a new fourth variety, saying he knew Peruvian chocolate makers who had been "producing this type of pink chocolate for years." He said purple was not an unusual color for chocolate, as cocoa beans are naturally pink and purple.

The public interest of the pink chocolate variety has been linked to the popularity of the color pink in marketing and on social media in the 2010s, a phenomenon that is referred to as "millennial pink".

=== Flavor ===
Ruby chocolate is characterized by a taste that has been described as slightly sweet and sour, which is comparable to that of berries, as the chocolate's main characteristic is its acidity. Angus Kennedy, the editor of Kennedy's Confection magazine, described the taste as a combination of white chocolate and raspberries.

== Legal status ==
Barry Callebaut was granted a European patent in 2012 and a U.S. patent in 2015 for the way its product is produced. In 2019, the United States Food and Drug Administration granted ruby chocolate a 15-month temporary marketing permit.

== Commercial availability ==
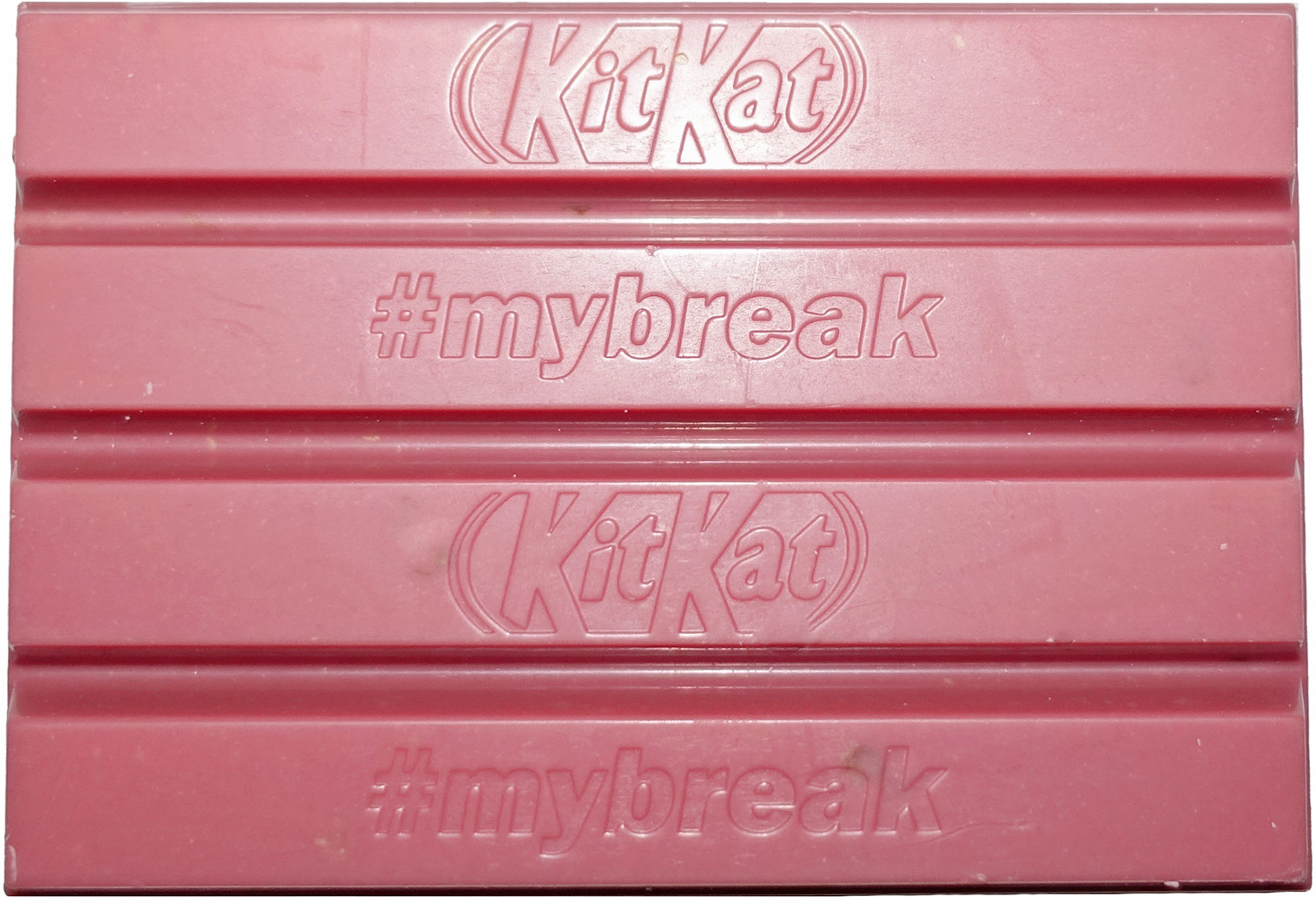
KitKat's Japanese Ruby Chocolate, introduced in 2018

The first mass market release of a ruby chocolate product was on 19 January 2018, when it was introduced as a coating for a new Kit Kat wafer bar in Japan and South Korea. Nestlé, the manufacturers of Kit Kat, entered into an agreement with Barry Callebaut for exclusive use of the product for six months. Upon release in Japan, one bar cost 400 yen (US$3.60). In April 2018, Fortnum & Mason launched a pure ruby chocolate bar in the United Kingdom followed by Nestlé who announced the release of the ruby chocolate Kit Kat in the United Kingdom and Germany. In anticipation for Mother's Day in 2019, Kit Kat Canada announced the release of the ruby chocolate in Canada in a tweet.

Various other confectionery companies have released ruby chocolate-based products including:

- Chocolove released a "Ruby Chocolate" bar which has been available since 2019 or late 2018.
- Costa Coffee released "Ruby Hot Chocolate" made from ruby cocoa in January 2020.
- Häagen Dazs released a limited-edition ruby cacao ice cream in January 2020.
- Magnum released sweet cream ice cream bars dipped in a ruby chocolate in January 2020.
- Harry & David, a chocolate company based in Medford, Oregon, sells ruby cacao truffles and a ruby cacao bar.
- Starbucks offers a "Ruby Flamingo Frappuccino" as of 2020.

== See also ==
- Types of cocoa beans
