= Charles Kennedy (disambiguation) =

Charles Kennedy (1959–2015) was a Scottish politician and former leader of the UK Liberal Democrats.

Charles Kennedy may also refer to:

== Entertainers ==
- Charles Napier Kennedy (1852–1898), British artist
- Charles Rann Kennedy (playwright) (1871–1950), Anglo-American dramatist
- Charlie Kennedy (saxophonist) (1927–2009), big band-era alto saxophonist
- Charles Kennedy (1947–2005), American comedian, better known as Charles Rocket

== Soldiers ==
- Charles Pratt Kennedy (died 1875), British army officer and founder of Shimla
- Charles Thomas Kennedy (1873–1907), Scottish soldier and winner of the Victoria Cross
- Charles Kennedy, 5th Marquess of Ailsa (1875–1956), Scottish peer
- Charles Kennedy, 8th Marquess of Ailsa (1956–2015), Scottish peer

== Sportsmen ==
- Charles Kennedy (cricketer) (1849–1906), English cricketer
- Charles Kennedy (umpire) (1871–1911), American professional baseball umpire

== Others ==
- Charles Kennedy (diplomat) (1831–1908), senior British diplomat
- Charles Kennedy (economist) (1923–1997), Scottish economist
- Charles A. Kennedy (1869–1951), U.S. representative from Iowa
- Charles Rann Kennedy (1808–1867), English lawyer
- Charles Stuart Kennedy (born 1928), oral historian of American diplomats

== See also ==
- Charles Kennedy Scott (1876–1965), English organist and choral conductor
