= General Kennedy =

General Kennedy may refer to:

- Alfred Kennedy (British Army officer) (1870–1926), British Army major general
- Chase Wilmot Kennedy (1859–1936), U.S. Army major general
- Claudia J. Kennedy (born 1947), U.S. Army lieutenant general
- James Shaw Kennedy (1788–1865), British Army general
- John Kennedy (British Army officer, born 1878) (1878–1948), British Army major general
- John Kennedy (British Army officer, born 1893) (1893–1970), British Army major general
- John Doby Kennedy (1840–1896), Confederate States Army brigadier general
- Kevin B. Kennedy Jr. (fl. 1990s–2020s), Air Force major general
- Robert P. Kennedy (1840–1918), Union Army brigadier general of Volunteers
- Timothy M. Kennedy (general) (fl. 1970s–2000s), U.S. National Guard brigadier general

== See also ==
- Attorney General Kennedy (disambiguation)
