= Ihenacho =

Ihenacho is both a given name and surname. Notable people with the name include:

- Carl Ihenacho (born 1988), American football player
- Duke Ihenacho (born 1989), American football player
- Kennedy Ihenacho (born 1990), Nigerian musician
- Leo Ihenacho (born 1977), British singer

== See also ==
- Ego Ihenacho Ogbaro, Nigerian musician
