= Mary Ann Kennedy =

Mary Ann Kennedy is the name of:

- Mary Ann Kennedy (American singer), country music artist
- Mary Ann Kennedy (Scottish singer) (born 1968), also a radio presenter

== See also ==
- Mary Kennedy (disambiguation)
- Ann Kennedy (disambiguation)
