= Richard Kennedy =

Richard Kennedy or Rick Kennedy may refer to:

- Sir Richard Kennedy, 2nd Baronet (c. 1615–1685), Kennedy baronets
- Sir Richard Kennedy, 4th Baronet (c. 1686–1710), Kennedy baronets
- Richard Kennedy (New York politician), legislator
- Richard Kennedy (Oregon politician), legislator
- Richard Kennedy (Wisconsin politician) (1842–1903), merchant, miner and legislator
- Richard T. Kennedy (1919–1998), United States soldier and diplomat
- Richard D. Kennedy, ran against Robert Taft for Ohio in the 1962 United States House of Representatives elections
- Richard Kennedy (author) (1932–2025), American children's book writer
- Rick Kennedy (ice hockey) (born 1951), Canadian ice hockey player
- Rick Kennedy (historian) (born 1958), American cultural and intellectual historian
- Rick Kennedy (born 1960), Australian rules footballer
- Richard Kennedy (footballer) (born 1978), Irish former footballer

== See also ==
- Richard Kennedy Vosburgh
- Kennedy Richards
