= Attorney General Kennedy =

Attorney General Kennedy may refer to:

- Robert F. Kennedy (1925–1968), Attorney General of the United States
- Hugh Kennedy (judge) (1879–1936), Attorney General of Ireland

== See also ==
- General Kennedy (disambiguation)
