= Patrick Kennedy =

Patrick Kennedy may refer to:

== Politics ==
- P. J. Kennedy (1858–1929), member of Massachusetts House of Representatives, businessman, paternal grandfather of John F. Kennedy
- Patrick F. Kennedy (born 1949), Under Secretary of State
- Patrick J. Kennedy (born 1967), Rhode Island congressman and son of Ted Kennedy
- Patrick Kennedy (Canadian politician) (1832–1895), Irish-born contractor and political figure in Quebec
- Patrick Kennedy (Irish nationalist politician) (1864–1947), Irish nationalist Member of Parliament
- Patrick Kennedy (Limerick politician) (1941–2020), Fine Gael senator 1981–1992

== Other ==
- Patrick Kennedy (1786–1850), Bishop of Killaloe
- Patrick Kennedy (folklorist) (1801–1873), bookseller in Dublin
- Patrick Kennedy (farmer) (1823–1858), Irish emigrant and the father of Patrick Joseph Kennedy
- Patrick Bouvier Kennedy (1963), son of John F. Kennedy, born prematurely and lived 39 hours
- Patrick Brendan Kennedy (1929–1966), Irish mathematician
- Patrick Kennedy (swimmer) (born 1964), American swimmer
- Patrick Kennedy (actor) (born 1977), English actor
- Patrick Kennedy (director) (born 1985), British theatre director
- Patrick G. Kennedy (1881–1966), Irish Jesuit priest, naturalist and ornithologist
- Patrick Kennedy (banker), governor of the Bank of Ireland
- J. Patrick Kennedy, founder and owner of international software company OSIsoft
- Patrick O. Kennedy, the appellant in Kennedy v. Louisiana, which outlawed the death penalty for all crimes except murder

== See also ==
- Patrick Joseph Kennedy (disambiguation)
- Pat Kennedy (disambiguation)
- Paddy Kennedy (disambiguation)
