= Angus Kennedy =

Angus Kennedy may refer to:

- Angus Kennedy (actor), in television and theatre
- Angus Kennedy, 6th Marquess of Ailsa (1882–1957), Scottish peer
- Angus John Kennedy, Canadian politician
- Angus Kennedy, author and former editor of Kennedy's Confection magazine
