= Pat Kennedy =

Pat Kennedy may refer to:

- Pat Kennedy (footballer, born 1898) (1898–1981), Australian rules footballer for St Kilda
- Pat Kennedy (footballer, born 1903) (1903–1981), Australian rules footballer for Carlton and Hawthorn
- Matthew P. Kennedy (1908–1957), American basketball referee
- Patricia Kennedy Lawford (1924-2006), American socialite and sister of John F. Kennedy
- Pat Kennedy (coach) (born 1952), American college basketball coach

== See also ==
- Patrick Kennedy (disambiguation)
- Paddy Kennedy (disambiguation)
