= Donald Kennedy (disambiguation) =

Donald Kennedy (1931–2020) was an American scientist, public administrator and academic.

Donald Kennedy may also refer to:

- Donald Kennedy (Australian politician) (1807–1864), pastoralist, banker and member of the Victorian Legislative Council (Australia)
- Donald MacBeth Kennedy (1884–1957), farmer and provincial and federal level Canadian politician
- Donald Kennedy (footballer) (1888–1916), Scottish footballer
- Donald Mackenzie-Kennedy (1889–1965), British colonial administrator, Governor of Nyasaland and later, Mauritius
- Donald Gilbert Kennedy (1898–1976), teacher and British colonial administrator
- Don Kennedy (1930–2023), American radio and television personality
- Don Kennedy (actor) (1921–2013), American actor
- Don Kennedy (athlete) (1932–2014), American paralympic athlete, weightlifter and wheelchair basketball player
