= Catherine Kennedy =

Catherine Kennedy (or similar) may refer to:

- Kathryn Kennedy (1927–2009), California wine grower
- Kathryne Kennedy, American author
- Catherine Kennedy, character in The Abduction Club
- Katherine Kennedy, a contestant in Miss America 2005

== See also ==
- Cathy Kennedy (disambiguation)
- Kate Kennedy (disambiguation)
- Kathleen Kennedy (disambiguation)
