= Andrew Kennedy =

Andrew Kennedy may refer to:

- Andrew Kennedy (American politician) (1810–1847), U.S. Representative from Indiana
- Andrew Kennedy (Canadian politician) (1842–1904), contractor and politician from Quebec
- Andrew Kennedy, cover name for Andrzej Kowerski (1912–1988), Polish Army officer and SOE agent in World War II
- Andrew Karpati Kennedy (1931–2016), Hungarian-born British author and literary critic
- Andrew Kennedy (cricketer, born 1949), English cricketer
- Andrew Kennedy (basketball) (born 1965), American-Jamaican basketball player
- Andrew Kennedy (cricketer, born 1975), English cricketer
- Andrew Kennedy (tenor) (born 1977), English tenor

== See also ==
- Andy Kennedy (disambiguation)
