= Timothy Kennedy =

Timothy Kennedy may refer to:

- Tim Kennedy (politician) (born 1976), Representative from NY-26
- Tim Kennedy (fighter) (born 1979), American mixed martial artist
- Tim Kennedy (ice hockey) (born 1986), American ice hockey player
- Timothy M. Kennedy (general), retired brigadier general in the National Guard of the United States
