= Sarah Kennedy (disambiguation) =

Sarah Kennedy is British radio broadcaster.

Sarah Kennedy may also refer to:

- Sarah Kennedy (actress), semi-regular panelist on US TV show Match Game
- Sarah Kennedy (née Gurling), widow of British Liberal Democrat politician Charles Kennedy
- Sarah Ann Kennedy, British voice actress
- Sara Kennedy, Australian cricketer
- Sara Beaumont Kennedy, American writer
