= Alfred Kennedy =

Alfred Kennedy may refer to:

- Alfred Kennedy (British Army officer) (1870–1926), British general
- Alfred J. Kennedy (1878–1944), American politician from New York
- Alfred Ravenscroft Kennedy (1879–1943), British politician
