= Robert Kennedy (disambiguation) =

Robert F. Kennedy (1925–1968) was an American politician who served as U.S. Attorney General and a U.S. Senator until his assassination.

Robert, Bob, or Bobby Kennedy may also refer to:

== Business and industry ==
- Robert Kennedy (St. Paul) (1801–1889), American businessman and town president of Saint Paul, Minnesota
- Robert Lenox Kennedy (1822–1887), American banker and philanthropist
- Robert D. Kennedy (1932–2021), American businessman
- Robert Kennedy (publisher) (1938–2012), German-born Canadian magazine publisher

== Law and politics ==
- Robert P. Kennedy (1840–1918), American politician, U.S. Representative from Ohio
- Robert H. Kennedy (1869–1951), Canadian farmer, merchant and political figure in Nova Scotia
- Robert B. Kennedy (1940–2018), American politician from Lowell, Massachusetts
- Robert F. Kennedy Jr. (born 1954, son of Robert F. Kennedy) United States secretary of health and human services

== Sports ==
- Robert Kennedy (field hockey) (1880–1963), Irish field hockey player
- Robert Kennedy (high jumper) (1916–2004), British Olympic athlete
- Bob Kennedy (1920–2005), American baseball player and manager
- Bob Kennedy (American football, born 1921) (1921–2010), American football running back
- Bob Kennedy (American football, born 1928) (1928–1991), American football player
- Bob Kennedy (ice hockey) (1930–1998), Canadian ice hockey player
- Bobby Kennedy (footballer) (1937–2025), Scottish footballer
- Bob Kennedy (racing driver) (born 1942), American racing driver
- Bob Kennedy (runner) (born 1970), American distance runner
- Robert Kennedy (cricketer) (born 1972), cricketer from New Zealand
- Bobby Kennedy (racing driver) (born 1993), American racing driver
- Robert Kennedy (rugby union) (1925–1979), Rhodesian rugby union player
- Robert Kennedy (Canadian football) (born 1999), American football player
- Bobby Kennedy (American football) (born 1966), American college football coach

== Other people ==
- Robert Cobb Kennedy (1835–1865), American Confederate operative hanged for role in plot to burn New York City
- Robert Foster Kennedy (1884–1952), Irish-American neurologist
- Robert E. Kennedy (university president) (1915–2010), American academic at California Polytechnic State University
- Robert Kennedy (Jesuit) (born 1933), American Zen priest, Jesuit, psychotherapist, professor and author
- Robert Kennedy (chemist) (born 1962), American chemist
- Robert E. Kennedy (university dean), university administrator
- Robert F. Kennedy III (born 1984, grandson of Robert F. Kennedy), American filmmaker

== Other uses ==
- USNS Robert F. Kennedy, a John Lewis-class replenishment oiler
