= Chance Survivor =

2012 book by Andrew Karpati Kennedy

- Front cover
- Author: Andrew Karpati Kennedy
- Language: English
- Release number: 1st edition
- Subject: childhood and youth
- Genre: memoir
- Set in: Hungary and England
- Published: Bristol
- Publisher: Old Guard Press (Shearsman Books Ltd)
- Publication date: 15 July 2012
- Publication place: United Kingdom
- Media type: Print
- Pages: 207
- ISBN: 978-1-84861-190-0
- OCLC: 824602069
- Dewey Decimal: 940.53161092
- LC Class: D811.5 .K456 2012
- Website: Chance Survivor

Chance Survivor (2012) is Andrew Karpati Kennedy's literary memoir of his childhood and youth in Hungary, in a wartime labour camp near Vienna, and, from his mid-teens, at school and university in England.

== Summary ==
"Strong visual, sensory images reconstruct the slow, orderly world of a provincial Hungarian town in the early 1930s and its abrupt collapse, seen through the eyes of a bright, curious little boy born into an affluent, assimilated Jewish family." When the Nazis invaded Hungary in March 1944, Kennedy and his parents and sister were deported not to Auschwitz as intended but to a labour camp on the outskirts of Vienna. His father died there, but he, his mother and sister survived. Kennedy reprints his evocative account first published in The Observer of travelling on one of the deportation trains. He describes his return to his old school in Debrecen, his brief spell at the Fasori Gimnázium in Budapest and his outings to the theatre and opera as a young teenager. "Part II of the book, set in early postwar England, shows most clearly the trauma sustained by this boy who emerged from the camps alive yet unable to exist in the deepest part of his psyche: the Hungarian language." We see Kennedy moving to England to stay with his uncle in Ware and attending Hertford Grammar School, before earning a place at the University of Bristol to read English Literature. "What follows", writes Lazaroms, "is a long meditation on language, literature, and the tribulations of 'becoming English'."

== Critical reception ==
"With hindsight, one understands what an enormous work of emotional archaeology must have been involved in digging out that little boy from under the ruins of his destroyed world and reconstructing the smells, feelings, spaces and relationships that belonged to it."
