= Michael Kennedy =

Michael Kennedy may refer to:

== Entertainment ==
- Michael J. Kennedy (melodeon player) (1900–1978), Irish-American player of the one-row accordion
- Michael Kennedy (music critic) (1926–2014), British music critic, biographer and musicologist
- Michael Kennedy (director) (born 1954), Canadian TV/film director
- Michael Kennedy (screenwriter), American screenwriter known for Freaky and It's a Wonderful Knife

== Politics ==
- Michael Kennedy (Newfoundland politician) (1858–1917), Newfoundland politician
- Michael J. Kennedy (politician) (1897–1949), American businessman and politician
- Michael K. Kennedy (born 1939), American politician in the state of Iowa
- Michael Kennedy (Dublin politician) (born 1949), Irish Fianna Fail politician from Dublin
- Michael Kennedy (Longford politician) (died 1965), Irish Fianna Fail politician represented Longford-Westmeath
- Mike Kennedy (born 1969), U.S. representative for Utah's 3rd congressional district (2025–present)

== Sports ==
- Michael Kennedy (climber), American rock and alpine climber, and past editor of Climbing Magazine
- Michael Kennedy (footballer, born 1964), Australian rules footballer with Carlton and Sydney
- Michael Kennedy (footballer, born 1967), Australian rules footballer with the Brisbane Bears
- Mick Kennedy (Limerick hurler) (1911–1977), Irish hurler for the Limerick senior team
- Mick Kennedy (Offaly hurler), Irish hurler for the Offaly senior team
- Mick Kennedy (born 1961), footballer
- Mike Kennedy (American football) (born 1959), American football player
- Mike Kennedy (baseball), head baseball coach at Elon University
- Mike Kennedy (curler) (born 1962), Canadian curler (from New Brunswick)
- Mike Kennedy (ice hockey, born 1972), Canadian professional ice hockey centre

== Other ==
- Michael John Kennedy, American criminal defense attorney
- Michael L. Kennedy (1958–1997), son of Robert F. Kennedy
- Michael Kennedy (bishop) (born 1968), Australian prelate of the Catholic Church

== See also ==
- Michael O'Kennedy (1936–2022), Irish Fianna Fáil politician from Tipperary
- Mikhail Kennedy (born 1996), Northern Irish footballer
