= Patrick Joseph Kennedy =

Patrick Joseph Kennedy may refer to:

- P. J. Kennedy (1858–1929), member of the Kennedy family who served in the Massachusetts House of Representatives and Massachusetts State Senate
- Patrick J. Kennedy (born 1967), former Rhode Island congressman and great-grandson of the above
