= Henry Kennedy =

Henry Kennedy may refer to:

- Henry H. Kennedy Jr. (born 1948), American judge
- Henry Kennedy (architect) (died 1898), British architect
- Henry Kennedy (cricketer) (born 1882), Jamaican cricketer
- Henry Lamb Kennedy (died 1933), Fijian politician
- Henry Kennedy (runner) (fl. 1950s), winner of the 1956 NCAA DI steeplechase championship

== See also ==
- Harry Kennedy (disambiguation)
