= George Kennedy (disambiguation) =

George Kennedy (1925–2016) was an American actor.

George Kennedy may also refer to:

- George Kennedy (businessman) (1799–1870), founder of Georgetown, Ontario, Canada
- George N. Kennedy (1822–1901), New York politician and judge
- George Kennedy (sports promoter) (1881–1921), owner of the Montreal Canadiens ice hockey team, 1910–1921
- George Kennedy (Scottish footballer) (1882–1917), Scottish association footballer who played for Lincoln City and Chelsea
- George A. Kennedy (sinologist) (1901–1960), American professor of Chinese at Yale University, 1938–1960
- George Kennedy (Australian footballer) (1919–1979), Australian rules footballer
- George Kennedy (politician) (1927–2003), Canadian politician, Liberal Member of the Legislative Assembly of Quebec for the district of Châteauguay
- George A. Kennedy (classicist) (1928-2022), American classical scholar
- George Clayton Kennedy (1919–1980), American botanist
- George Kennedy (cricketer), English cricketer and British Army officer
