= Sean Kennedy =

Sean Kennedy may refer to:

- Death of Sean Kennedy (1987–2007), American manslaughter victim
- Sean Kennedy (Hollyoaks), a character in UK teen soap opera Hollyoaks
- Sean Kennedy (author) (born 1973), Canadian radio author
- Sean Kennedy (rugby union) (born 1991), Scottish rugby union player
- Sean J. Kennedy (born 1974), American drummer
- Sean Kennedy, a character in UK drama series Hustle
- Sean Kennedy, Canadian musician in rock band Blood Ceremony
- Sean Kennedy (1985–2021), Australian musician, bassist in metalcore band I Killed the Prom Queen
