= Ann Kennedy =

Ann, Anna, Anne, or Annie Kennedy may refer to:

== People ==
- Ann Kennedy, an actress in Meet the Wife
- Anna Kennedy; see 1976–77 National Camogie League
- Anna Kennedy (born 1960), school founder
- Anne Kennedy, New Zealand writer
- Annie Kennedy (1851–1918), American educator
- Anne Gamble Kennedy (1920–2001), American classical pianist and piano professor
- Annie Brown Kennedy (1924–2023), American politician and attorney in North Carolina

== Fictional characters ==
- Ann Kennedy, see list of former Coronation Street characters
- Anne Kennedy, character in The Abduction Club

== Née Kennedy ==
- Ann VanderMeer (born 1957), American publisher
- Anne Disbrowe (c. 1795–1855), British society hostess
- Annie Bidwell (1839–1918), American pioneer and founder of society

== See also ==
- Mary Ann Kennedy (disambiguation)
