= Kennedy Okonkwo =

Nigerian businessman (born 1977)

- Born: 12 October 1977 (age 48); Lagos, Nigeria
- Education: Bachelor of Science (BSc), Psychology. University of Ibadan; Masters in Business Administration, Marketing. Lagos State University
- Occupations: Real-estate entrepreneur, businessman
- Years active: 2013–present
- Known for: Real Estate
- Notable work: Victoria Crest Homes
- Title: Founder/CEO of Nedcomoaks
- Spouse: Ichechi Okonkwo
- Children: 3

Kennedy Okonkwo (//; born 12 October 1977) is a Nigerian businessman, philanthropist, and real-estate entrepreneur. He is the founder and CEO of Nedcomoaks Limited.

== Early life and education ==
Kennedy hails from Ojoto, Anambra State. Kennedy was born and raised in Lagos, Nigeria, where he had his primary and secondary school education. Kennedy attended the University of Ibadan, where he obtained a Bachelor of Science (BSc) in Psychology and the Lagos State University, where he obtained his Masters in Business Administration.

== Career and philanthropy ==
In 2007, Kennedy founded Nedcomoaks Limited, a Real Estate company with zero capital. He is the founder of the Kennedy Okonkwo Programme For Tech Entrepreneurs. Kennedy is the sponsor of the Eti Osa community Oba's cup.

== Personal life ==
Kennedy is married to Ichechi Okonkwo. He lives in Lagos, Nigeria with his wife and children.

== Awards and recognition ==
- Peace Legend Icon of the Year 2019
- African Achievers Award - Excellence in Enterprise and Business Innovation 2019
- Entrepreneur of the Year - Nigerian Entrepreneurs Award 2018
- African Business Personality of the Year 2017
