= Paddy Kennedy =

Paddy Kennedy may refer to:

- Paddy Kennedy (politician) (1942–1999), Northern Irish politician
- Paddy Kennedy (Down Gaelic footballer), 1991 All Star winner
- Paddy Kennedy (Kerry Gaelic footballer) (1917–1979), Kerry Gaelic football player
- Paddy Kennedy (Sligo Gaelic footballer) (1926–2011), Sligo Gaelic football player
- Paddy Kennedy (association footballer) (1934–2007), Irish footballer with Manchester United, Blackburn Rovers and Southampton

== See also ==
- Patrick Kennedy (disambiguation)
- Paddy Kenny (born 1978), football goalkeeper
