= Adam Kennedy (disambiguation) =

Adam Kennedy is a retired baseball player.

Adam Kennedy may also refer to

- Adam Kennedy (actor) (1922–1997), American actor, screenwriter, novelist, and painter
- Adam Kennedy (American football) (born 1991), American football quarterback
- Adam Kennedy (footballer) (born 1992), Australian rules footballer for the Greater Western Sydney Giants
- Adam Kennedy (government official), former Trump White House staff member; see Executive appointments by Donald Trump
- Adam Kennedy (programmer), Australian Perl programmer
- Adam Kennedy (tennis) (born 1983), Australian tennis player
