= Kathleen Kennedy =

Kathleen Kennedy may refer to:

- Kathleen Cavendish, Marchioness of Hartington (1920–1948), born Kathleen Kennedy, sister of U.S. President John F. Kennedy
- Kathleen Kennedy Townsend (born 1951), Maryland politician and daughter of Robert F. Kennedy
- Kathleen Kennedy (producer) (born 1953), American film producer
- Kathy Kennedy (born 1957), Connecticut politician
- Kathleen "Kick" Kennedy (born 1988), philanthropist and daughter of Robert F. Kennedy Jr.

== See also ==
- Kate Kennedy (disambiguation)
- Cathy Kennedy (disambiguation)
