= Daniel Kennedy (actor) =

American actor

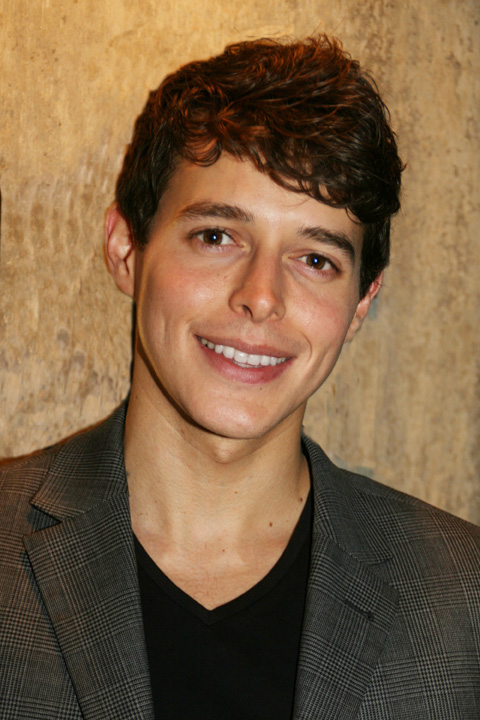
Daniel Kennedy

Daniel Kennedy (born October 24, 1983) is an American actor, known for his portrayal of Pete Cortlandt on the ABC daytime drama All My Children in 2008 and 2009.

== Early life ==
Kennedy was born in Tucson, AZ. He moved to New York City to attend The Juilliard School where he became the first student in the school's history to major in both drama and vocal arts.

== Career ==
=== All My Children ===
Kennedy's first portrayal of Peter Cortlandt aired on July 11, 2008. Peter "Petey" Cortlandt was born late in life to Opal and Palmer. Pete returned to Pine Valley as a teen and immediately fell head over heels in love with Colby Chandler played by co-star Brianne Moncrief. To prove his love he offered to help her cover up her part in the hit-and-run of Richie Novak; she initially refused but then gave in. Luckily, Colby was cleared of the charges. Pete confessed his love many times but Colby would not listen so he teamed up with Adam Chandler and offered to help him ruin Fusion's new perfume, 'Bella,' in exchange for Adam's blessing with Colby. Adam agreed; Pete tainted the perfume with his own concoction, but not before he was struck by lightning.

== Cambridge ==
After leaving All My Children, Kennedy earned a Master of Philosophy from Clare College, Cambridge on a full academic scholarship. His dissertation on Creativity and Precognition, which was supervised by Nobel Prize-winning physicist, Brian Josephson, earned him a mark of Distinction.
