= Rose Kennedy (disambiguation) =

Rose Kennedy (1890–1995) was an American Papal countess, philanthropist, socialite, and the matriarch of the Kennedy family. She was also the mother of President John F. Kennedy, and U.S. Senators Robert F. Kennedy and Ted Kennedy.

May also refer to:

- Rosemary Kennedy (1918–2005), daughter of Rose Kennedy
- Rosie Kennedy, character in Bad Behaviour

== See also ==
- Rose Kennedy Schlossberg (born 1988), American actress and great-granddaughter of Rose Kennedy
