= Martin Kennedy =

Martin Kennedy may refer to:

- Martin Kennedy (composer) (born 1978), English composer of contemporary classical music
- Martin Kennedy (hurler) (1898–1983), Irish hurler
- Martin Kennedy (Kansas politician)
- Martin Kennedy (New Zealand politician) (1836–1916), Member of Parliament from Westland, New Zealand
- Martin Kennedy (rugby league) (born 1989), Australian professional rugby league footballer
- Martin J. Kennedy (1892–1955), U.S. Representative from New York
- Martin Kennedy, a character in Retreat (2011 film)
