= Dan Kennedy (politician) =

American politician

Member of the Montana House of Representatives from the 57 district
- In office 2010 to present

Personal details
- Party: Republican

Dan Kennedy is a Republican member of the Montana Legislature. He was elected to House District 57 which represents a portion of the Billings area.
