= Edward Kennedy (disambiguation) =

Ted Kennedy (Edward Moore Kennedy, 1932–2009) was a United States Senator from Massachusetts.

Edward Kennedy may also refer to:

- Edward Kennedy (priest) (died 1864), Dean of Clonfert from 1850 to 1864
- Edward Kennedy (Royal Navy officer) (1879–1939), Royal Navy sailor
- Edward Kennedy (journalist) (c. 1905–1963), journalist who first reported the German surrender in World War II
- Edward Dean Kennedy (1945–1992), American murderer executed in Florida
- Edward J. Kennedy (1951–2025), American politician from Massachusetts
- Edward Joseph Kennedy (1851–?), Irish nationalist politician, Member of Parliament for South Sligo
- Edward M. Kennedy Jr. (born 1961), American businessman and son of U.S. Senator Ted Kennedy and Virginia Joan Bennett
- Edward Shirley Kennedy (1817–1898), English mountaineer
- Edward Stewart Kennedy (1912–2009), historian of science
- Eddie Kennedy (born 1960), Irish painter

== See also ==
- Ed Kennedy (disambiguation)
- Ted Kennedy (disambiguation)
