= Sam Kennedy =

Sam Kennedy may refer to:

== Fictional characters ==
- Sam Kennedy (Holby City)
- Sam Kennedy (Home and Away)

== Sportspeople ==
- Sam Kennedy (American football) (born 1964), former American football linebacker
- Sam Kennedy (footballer, born 1881) (1881–1955), Scottish international footballer
- Sam Kennedy (footballer, born 1896) (1896–1963), English footballer
- Sam Kennedy (footballer, born 1899) (1899–?), Scottish footballer

== Others ==
- Sam Kennedy (baseball executive) (born 1973), president of the Boston Red Sox of Major League Baseball
- Sam Kennedy, an alias of tax protester Glenn Unger (born 1951)
