= Joan Kennedy =

Joan Kennedy may refer to:

- Joan Kennedy (soldier) (1908–1956), Canadian soldier
- Joan Kennedy Taylor (1926–2005), American writer and political activist
- Joan Bennett Kennedy (1936–2025), American socialite, musician, author, model and first wife of U.S. Senator Ted Kennedy
- Joan Kennedy (musician) (active since 1983), Canadian country music singer
- Joan Kennedy (novelist), pseudonym of Mabel Alice Morrison, English journalist and writer
