= Diane Kennedy =

American financial writer

Diane Kennedy (born 1956) is an American CPA, speaker, and financial writer. She is the author of The Wall Street Journal and Business Week bestsellers, Loopholes of the Rich and Real Estate Loopholes as well as The Insider's Guide to Real Estate Investing Loopholes, Tax Loopholes for eBay Sellers, and Smart Business Stupid Business.

== Career ==
Diane Kennedy received a BS in accounting from the University of Nevada, Reno. She has served as an instructor at her alma mater and was chosen to be a lecturer on U.S. tax laws to companies in the People's Republic of China.

Kennedy is the founder and owner of USTaxAid Services, a full service tax firm. She is also the owner and founder of USTaxAid.com, a tax education company dedicated to simplifying federal and state tax laws so that individuals can better manage their own tax planning. She is the host of an Internet radio show on taxes, Radio US Tax Aid.

Kennedy has written for The Tax Savings Report, Investment Advisor Magazine, Personal Excellence, the Money & Finance section of Balance Magazine, Healthy Wealthy n Wise, Accounting Web and is a regular contributor to Toolbox for Finance and Foreclosures.com. She has been featured in Kiplinger's Personal Finance, The Wall Street Journal, USA Today, and the Associated Press. Her national appearances include CNN, CNNfn, Bloomberg Television, CNBC, and StockTalkAmerica.

She also has received the Blue Chip Enterprise award as “the business owner demonstrating the most entrepreneurial spirit in the State of Nevada.”

== Books authored by Diane Kennedy ==
(All book descriptions come from the Books Page Diane Kennedy's website)

- Smart Business, Stupid Business (2010) “What School Never Taught You About Building a Successful Business Make More Money & Pay Less Tax”
- Insider’s Guide to Real Estate Investing Loopholes (2005) “This book reveals all the best and most effective tax loopholes the successful investors use to maximize their profits.”
- Loopholes of the Rich: How the Rich Legally Make More Money & Pay Less Tax (2004) “Secrets of Building tax-advantaged wealth are no longer available ONLY to the rich. Loopholes of the Rich helps you make more money and pay less tax.”
- Insider’s Guide to Tax-Free Real Estate Investment – Retire Rich Using Your IRA (2006) “The secrets of tax-free investing from best selling author Diane Kennedy & Dolf de Roos. This book will teach you how to retire rich using your IRA.”
- Tax Loopholes for eBay Sellers (2005) “Even if you don’t have an eBay business, you can start one today and save hundreds, even thousands, in taxes. This is a must read for eBay sellers.”
- Insider’s Guide to Making Money in Real Estate (2005) “This book explains why real estate is a consistent moneymaker and how you can build your fortune, regardless of credit or money in the bank.”
- Real Estate Loopholes: Secrets of Successful Real Estate Investing (2003) “By examining the three keys of successful real estate investing-selection, taxation, and protection – Real Estate Loopholes shows what it takes to make a real estate investment work.”
