= Dan Kennedy (author) =

American writer and humorist

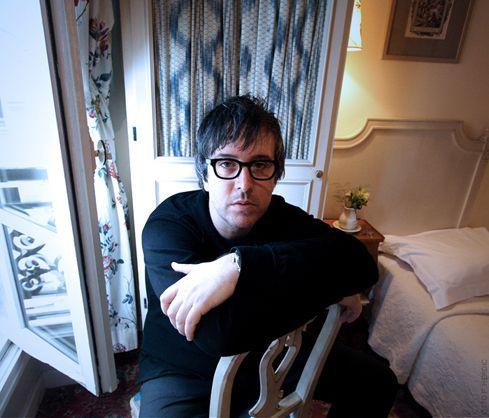
Dan Kennedy, Paris 2009

Dan Kennedy is an American humorist, writer, and early podcaster known as an original host and developer of The Moth storytelling podcast in New York. He is currently living and working in Los Angeles.

== Biography ==
Dan Kennedy started performing on stage with New York-based storytelling collective The Moth in 2000, going on to spearhead the development and release of The Moth podcast in 2008, serving as one of the podcast’s hosts from 2008–2020. Wired Magazine celebrated the 10th anniversary of The Moth podcast in a profile outlining its rise from two thousand subscribers to forty-six million downloads per year. In 2019, the podcast was downloaded 71 million times. In 2022, Kennedy returned for one episode (#773), to discuss the creation and launch of The Moth Podcast.

In 2003 Kennedy published his first book, Loser Goes First: My Thirty-Something Years of Dumb Luck and Minor Humiliation, with Random House. A memoir followed in 2008 entitled Rock On: An Office Power Ballad, which The New York Times described as "...a succession of gently mordant vignettes, with hilariously spot-on asides about media image-making". He discussed the book, and his time working as a Creative Director for Atlantic Records in New York, with Terry Gross on NPR's "Fresh Air". Kennedy's debut novel American Spirit was released in 2013, receiving the coveted starred review from Publishers Weekly, which heralded the book as having, "...far surpassed the creation of character and conjured an entity so alive in its knowledge of impending death that we're captured in a new idea of what it's like to live." Kennedy's work has appeared in GQ Magazine and on the Peabody Award winning Moth Radio Hour, and has been widely anthologized in literary collections in Europe and the United States. His writing first gained attention at McSweeney's literary website and journal, where his work continues to focus on navigating daily life.

With a background in New York advertising and the music industry, Kennedy moved into writing and consulting in film and television, selling series pilots to HBO and F/X and working on feature film assignments at Amblin, Paramount, and Amazon Studios. In 2021, he served as a creative consultant on the NBC Peacock Original Series "True Story with Ed and Randall" and previously sat on the judging committees of the Writers Guild of America "Made in New York" Television Fellowship Program, the PEN- America Jean Stein Grant for Literary Oral History, and served on the readers panel of the 2025 Writers Guild of America New York Screenwriting Fellowship.

== Bibliography ==
=== Complete List of Books ===
- Loser Goes First: My Thirty-Something Years of Dumb Luck and Minor Humiliation (Random House/Crown, 2003)
- Rock On: An Office Power Ballad (Algonquin, 2008)
- American Spirit: A Novel (Houghton Mifflin Harcourt/Littla a, 2013)

=== Selected anthologies ===
- Embrace the Merciless Joy: The McSweeney's Guide to Rearing Small, Medium, and Large Children (2023) Edited by Chris Monks, Jennifer Traig
- How to Tell a Story: The Essential Guide to Memorable Storytelling from The Moth, by The Moth (2022)
- The Moth Presents: Occasional Magic. True Stories About Defying the Impossible, edited by Catherine Burns (2019)
- Keep Scrolling Till You Feel Something: 21 Years of Humor from McSweeney's Internet Tendency (2019) edited by Chris Monks, Sam Riley
- McSweeney's Issue 50 (McSweeney's Quarterly Concern) (2017), edited by Dave Eggers
- Created in Darkness by Troubled Americans: The Best of McSweeney's Humor, Editors Dave Eggers, Kevin Shay, Lee Epstein, John Warner, Suzanne Kleid
- Our Noise: The Story of Merge Records, by John Cook, Mac McCaughan, Laura Ballance, Ray Porter
- Humor Me: An Anthology of Funny Contemporary Writing (Plus Some Great Old Stuff Too), edited by Ian Frazier
- Bookmark Now: Writing in Unreaderly Times, Edited by Kevin Sampsell
- The Encyclopedia of Exes, Edited by Meredith Broussard
- The Autobiographer's Handbook: The 826 National Guide to Writing Your Memoir, edited by Jennifer Traig
- McSweeney's Issue 35 (McSweeney's Quarterly Concern), edited by Dave Eggers
- The McSweeney's Book of Politics and Musicals, by the editors of McSweeney's
- The Insomniac Reader: Stories of the Night, Edited by Kevin Sampsell
- The Best of McSweeney's Internet Tendency, Edited by Chris Monks, John Warner
- Love Is a Four-Letter Word: True Stories of Breakups, Bad Relationships, and Broken Hearts, Edited by Michael Taeckens
- Mountain Man Dance Moves: The McSweeney's Book of Lists, by the editors of McSweeney's
