= Ed Kennedy =

Ed Kennedy may refer to:

- Edward J. Kennedy (1951–2025), Massachusetts state senator
- Ed Kennedy (infielder) (1861–1912), Major League Baseball infielder
- Ed Kennedy (outfielder) (1856–1905), Major League Baseball outfielder
- Ed Kennedy (rugby union), Australian rugby union player
- Ed Kennedy (racing driver), American professional stock car racing driver
- Edward Kennedy (journalist) (c. 1905–1963), journalist who first reported the German surrender in World War II

== See also ==
- Ted Kennedy (disambiguation)
- Edward Kennedy (disambiguation)
