= Walter Kennedy =

Walter Kennedy may refer to:

- Walter Kennedy (poet) (c. 1455–c. 1508), Scottish poet
- Walter Kennedy (pirate) (died 1721), Irish pirate
- Walter S. Kennedy (died 1954), All-American football player for the University of Chicago, 1897–1898
- J. Walter Kennedy (1912–1977), commissioner of the National Basketball Association
- Wally Kennedy (born 1948), radio host
- Walter L. Kennedy (1920–1997), politician in the Vermont House of Representatives
