= Elizabeth Kennedy =

Elizabeth Kennedy may refer to:

- Libby Kennedy, Neighbours character
- Elizabeth Lapovsky Kennedy (1939–2026), feminist and lesbian historian
- Liz Kennedy, character in The Young Doctors
- Betty Kennedy (1926–2017), Canadian broadcaster
- Elizabeth M. Kennedy (died 1958), president of the Women's Engineering Society
