= Ronald Kennedy =

Ronald or Ron Kennedy may refer to:

== Sportspeople ==
- Ron Kennedy (1953–2009), Canadian ice hockey player and trainer
- Ron Kennedy (footballer) (1919–2006), Australian rules footballer

== Others ==
- Ronald C. Kennedy, virus immunologist at Texas Tech University
- Ron Kennedy (actor) (1931–2010), American voice-over artist and character actor
- Ronald Kennedy of the Kennedy baronets
