= Seamus Kennedy =

Seamus Kennedy may refer to:

- Séamus Kennedy (cyclist) (1947–2012), Irish cyclist
- Séamus Kennedy (hurler) (born 1993), Irish Gaelic footballer and hurler
- Seamus Kennedy (singer), singer, comedian and writer
