= Charles Kennedy (diplomat) =

British diplomat (1831–1908)

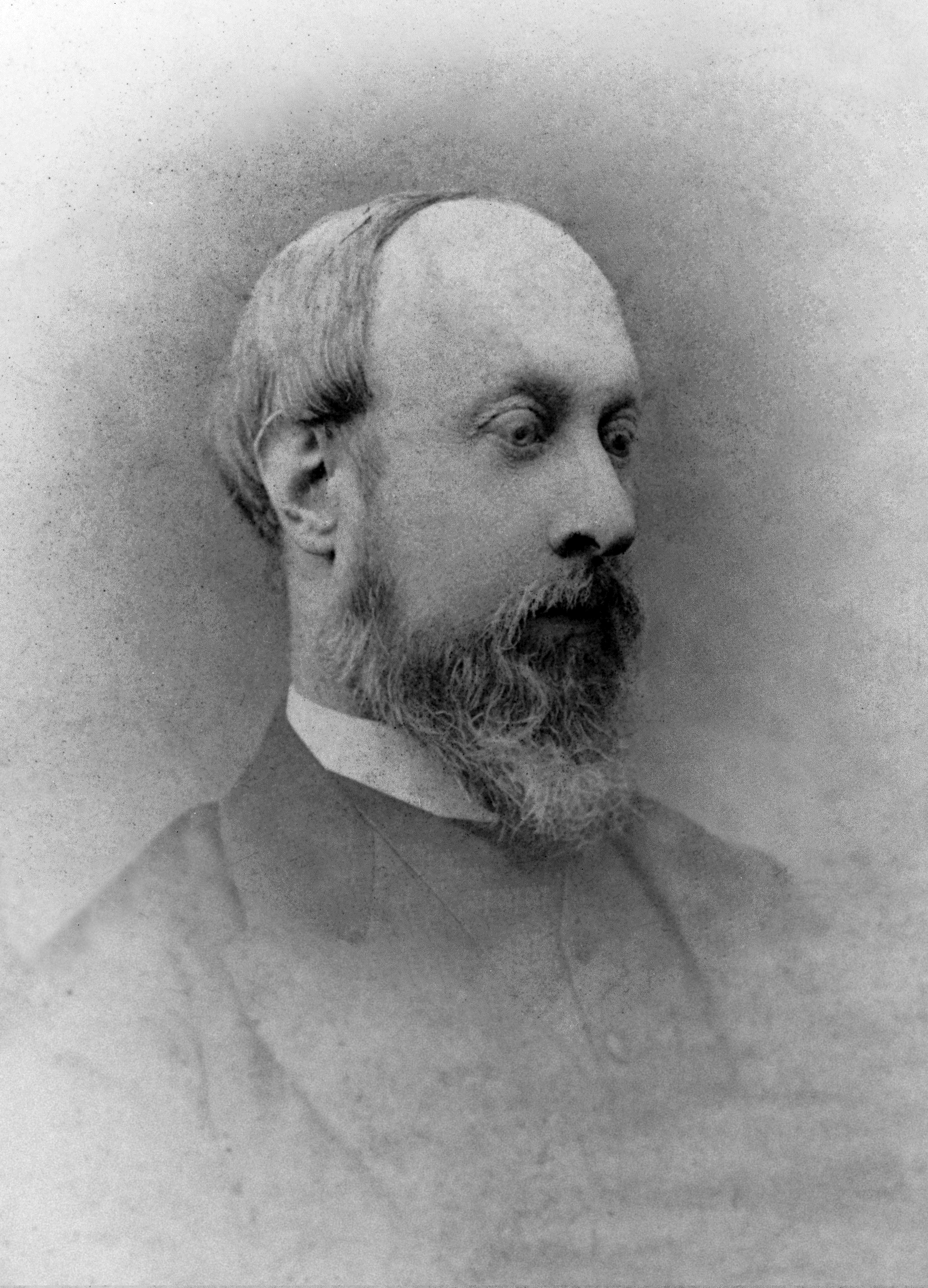
Kennedy, c. 1890s

Sir Charles Kennedy KCMG CB (12 October 1831 – 25 October 1908) was a British diplomat.

== Early life ==
Charles Malcolm Kennedy was born on 12 October 1831, in London, to politician James Kennedy. He was educated at Blundell's School in Tiverton and at Caius College at Cambridge (where he took two firsts).

== Diplomatic career ==
Kennedy entered the Foreign Office in 1852. He served chiefly in the commercial branch, attaining the senior clerkship there early in the 1870s. This was his substantive appointment for many years, but he was almost constantly engaged on special services abroad.

His first deputation (1870–71) was to the Levant as president of a commission of inquiry into the Consular establishments. He was British Commissioner in Paris in connection with the Treaty of Commerce and Navigation (concluded with the newly established republic in 1872). On several occasions questions relating to interchange of commerce between Great Britain and France took him to Paris, the last of them being when he assisted Sir Charles Dilke then Under-Foreign Secretary, to negotiate the subsisting Treaty. In conjunction with Sir Edward Malet he was involved in the arrangements with Italy in 1875 for the renewal of the commercial treaty signed eight years before. He was on the Joint Channel Tunnel Commission. He was on the Commission of commerce and industry at Brussels in 1880. He was Senior British delegate to the North Sea Fisheries Conference in 1881 at The Hague (and was appointed plenipotentiary for the signature of the resulting Convention). He was Senior British delegate to various international conferences on the protection of submarine cables held in Paris from 1882 to 1886 (Kennedy contributing powerfully to the resulting settlement). He represented Great Britain at a conference at The Hague for the restriction of the liquor traffic in the North Sea. He represented Great Britain in the negotiations in Paris regarding the Channel Fisheries.

== Later life ==
Kennedy was appointed Knight Commander of the Order of St Michael and St George in 1893, and retired from public service the following year. About this time he was appointed Commander of the Order of Leopold.

From 1895 to 1902, Kennedy was lecturer on international Law at University College, Bristol, a number of those lectures being published.

Years earlier he had edited "Kennedy's Ethnological and Linguistic Essays" and was chairman of the Exmouth School Board from 1896 to the dissolution of separate school authorities under the Education Act 1902. He was an active member of the council of the Society of Arts. He died on 25 October 1908.
