= Peter Kennedy =

Peter Kennedy may refer to:

- Peter Kennedy (artist) (born 1945), Australian artist, co-founder of artist cooperative Inhibodress in Sydney around 1970
- Peter Kennedy (cricketer) (born 1965), New Zealand cricketer
- Peter Kennedy (economist) (1943–2010), Canadian economist
- Peter Kennedy (diplomat) (born 1949), New Zealand ambassador
- Peter Kennedy (figure skater) (born 1927), American pair skater
- Peter Kennedy (folklorist) (1922–2006), folklorist and folk musician
- Peter Kennedy (folk-rock musician) of The Kennedys
- Peter Kennedy (footballer) (born 1973), Northern Irish footballer
- Peter Kennedy (journalist) (born 1942/43), Australian political journalist
- Peter Kennedy (priest), controversial priest in Australia
- Peter Kennedy (sailor) (born 1964), Irish Olympic sailor
