= Andy Kennedy (disambiguation) =

Andy Kennedy (born 1968) is an American basketball coach.

Andy Kennedy may also refer to:

- Andy Kennedy (Australian footballer) (1883–1946), Australian rules footballer
- Andy Kennedy (footballer, born 1897) (1897–1963), Northern Ireland footballer, played for Arsenal
- Andy Kennedy (footballer, born 1964), Scottish footballer, played for Rangers, Birmingham City Blackburn Rovers and others

== See also ==
- Andrew Kennedy (disambiguation)
