= Maurice Kennedy =

Maurice Kennedy may refer to:

- Maurice Kennedy (politician) (1884–1939), Australian politician
- Maurice Kennedy (rugby league) (born 1988), Fijian rugby league footballer
