= Ray Kennedy (disambiguation) =

Ray Kennedy (1951–2021) was an English footballer for Arsenal and Liverpool.

Ray or Raymond Kennedy may also refer to:

- Raymond Kennedy (novelist) (1934–2008), American novelist
- Raymond Louis Kennedy (1946–2014), singer-songwriter and musician
- Raymond M. Kennedy (1891–1976), guiding light and architect of the Grauman's Chinese Theater
- Ray Kennedy (country singer) (born 1954), country music artist
- Ray Kennedy (pianist) (1957–2015), American jazz pianist
- Ray Kennedy (journalist) (born 1970), Irish journalist
- Ray Kennedy (baseball) (1895–1969), American baseball player, scout and executive
