= Margaret Kennedy (disambiguation) =

Margaret Kennedy (1896–1967) was an English novelist and playwright.

Margaret Kennedy may also refer to:

- Margaret Kennedy, Countess of Cassilis (died 1580), Scottish aristocrat
- Margaret L. Kennedy (1892–?), Irish Fianna Fáil politician
- Margaret Kennedy Knight (1903–1983), English psychologist and humanist
- Margaret Kennedy (singer) (died 1793), contralto singer and actress
- Margaret Stephen Kennedy (1814–1891), zenana missionary
- Margaret Kennedy (American politician)

== See also ==
- Margrit Kennedy (1939–2013), German architect, professor, environmentalist and author
