= Mary Kennedy (disambiguation) =

Mary Kennedy (born 1954) is an Irish television presenter.

Mary Kennedy may also refer to:

== Media and entertainment ==
- Máire Ní Chinnéide (1879–1967), also called Mary Kennedy, Irish scholar
- Mary B. Kennedy (born 1947), American neuroscientist
- Mary Ann Kennedy (Scottish singer) (born 1968), Scottish singer and radio presenter
- Mary Ann Kennedy (American singer), country music artist
- M. F. K. Fisher (1908–1992), née Kennedy, American food writer
- Mary-Kathryn Kennedy, American television producer
- Mary Kerry Kennedy (born 1959), American human rights activist and writer
- Mimi Kennedy (Mary Kennedy, born 1948), American actress and author

== Others ==
- Mary Clare Kennedy (fl. 1647) , abbess of the Poor Clares of Galway
- Mary Olivia Kennedy (1880–1943), journalist and first woman staff reporter of The Times
- Mary Kennedy, character in The Neglected Wife
- Mary Richardson Kennedy (1959–2012), member of the Kennedy family
- Mary Elizabeth Kennedy (1911–1991), American artist and quilter
- Mary Augusta Kennedy (1857–1923), American activist
- Mary Kennedy Carter (1934–2010), née Kennedy, social studies teacher and civil rights activist in Ohio, United States
