= Les Kennedy =

Les Kennedy may refer to

- Les Kennedy (golfer), American golfer, in the 1950 Masters Tournament
- Les Kennedy (journalist) (1958–2011), Australian journalist
