= Mark Kennedy =

Mark Kennedy may refer to:

- Mark Kennedy (judge) (1952–2024), American jurist
- Mark Kennedy (Australian footballer) (born 1972), Australian rules footballer
- Mark Kennedy (boxer) (born 1967), Jamaica boxer
- Mark Kennedy (footballer, born 1976), Irish football player
- Mark Kennedy (musician) (1951–2026), Australian musician
- Mark Kennedy (police officer) (born 1969), British undercover police officer
- Mark Kennedy (politician) (born 1957), American politician and university president

== See also ==
- Marc Kennedy (born 1982), Canadian curler
- Mark Kennedy Shriver (born 1964), former Maryland state representative, and son of Eunice Kennedy Shriver and member of the Kennedy family
