= Dan Kennedy (1900s hurler) =

Irish hurler

Dan Kennedy (Irish: Dónall Ó Cinnéide) was an Irish sportsperson who played hurling with the Kilkenny senior team. In a senior inter-county career that lasted from 1905 until 1917, he won six All-Ireland titles and three Leinster titles. Kennedy began his sporting career playing for local club Tullaroan.
