= Arthur Kennedy (disambiguation) =

Arthur Kennedy (1914–1990) was an American film actor.

Arthur Kennedy may also refer to:

- Sir Arthur Kennedy (colonial administrator) (1809–1883), British colonial administrator
- Arthur Leo Kennedy (born 1942), American Roman Catholic cleric who was auxiliary bishop in Boston, Massachusetts
- Arthur Kennedy (football manager), manager of Arsenal F.C. in 1899
- Arthur Garfield Kennedy (1880–1954), American philologist
