= Paul Kennedy (disambiguation) =

Paul Kennedy (born 1945) is a British historian.

Paul Kennedy may also refer to:

- Paul Kennedy (American judge) (born c. 1949), member of the New Mexico Supreme Court
- Paul Kennedy (Australian journalist) (born 1975), Australian journalist, television presenter and former Australian rules footballer
- Paul Kennedy (English judge) (born 1935), criminal court judge, Interception of Communications Commissioner, on Gibraltar appellate court
- Paul Kennedy (host) (fl. 1970s–2010s), broadcast journalist at the Canadian Broadcasting Corporation
- Paul Kennedy (psychologist) (born 1959) Irish clinical psychologist
- Paul Kennedy (rugby union) (born 1957), Irish rugby union player
