= Ted Kennedy (disambiguation) =

Ted Kennedy (1932–2009) was a U.S. Senator from Massachusetts.

Ted Kennedy may also refer to:

- Ted Kennedy (ice hockey) (1925–2009), Canadian Hall of Fame ice hockey player
- Ted Kennedy (priest) (1931–2005), Australian priest
- Ted Kennedy (baseball) (1865–1907), American baseball player
- Ted Kennedy (footballer) (1877–1948), Australian rules footballer
- Ted Kennedy (racing driver) (born 1955), American racing driver

== See also ==
- Ed Kennedy (disambiguation)
- Edward Kennedy (disambiguation)
