= Charles Kennedy (cricketer) =

English cricketer

Personal information
- Full name: Charles Marshall Kennedy
- Born: 15 December 1849; Woodmancote, Sussex, England
- Died: 31 January 1906 (aged 56); Tunbridge Wells, Kent, England
- Batting: Right-handed
- Role: Wicket-keeper

Domestic team information
- Years: Team
- 1872–1878: Sussex

Career statistics
Competition	First-class
Matches	23
Runs scored	284
Batting average	7.88
100s/50s	–/–
Top score	37
Balls bowled	–
Wickets	–
Bowling average	–
5 wickets in innings	–
10 wickets in match	–
Best bowling	–
Catches/stumpings	8/1
- Source: Cricinfo, 14 March 2012

Charles Marshall Kennedy (15 December 1849 – 31 January 1906) was an English cricketer. Kennedy was a right-handed batsman who fielded as a wicket-keeper. He was born at Woodmancote, Sussex.

Kennedy made his first-class debut for Sussex against Gloucestershire in 1872. He made twenty further first-class appearances for the county, the last of which came against Surrey in 1878. In his 21 first-class matches for Sussex, he scored a total of 272 runs at an average of 8.00, with a high score of 37. He also made two first-class appearances for the South against the North in 1875.

He died at Tunbridge Wells, Kent, on 31 January 1906.
