= Donald Kennedy (footballer) =

Scottish footballer

Personal information
- Full name: Donald Hall Kennedy
- Date of birth: 1888
- Place of birth: Ardrossan, Scotland
- Date of death: 18 November 1916 (aged 28)
- Place of death: Beaumont-Hamel, France
- Positions: Forward; half back

Senior career*
Years	Team	Apps	(Gls)
1909–1910	Arthurlie	4	(1)
1909	→ Vale of Leven (loan)	1	(0)
1910–1915	Abercorn	25	(1)
- * Club domestic league appearances and goals

Donald Hall Kennedy MM (1888 – 18 November 1916) was a Scottish footballer who played in the Scottish League for Abercorn, Arthurlie and Vale of Leven as a forward and half back.

== Personal life ==
Prior to the First World War, Kennedy worked as a sculptor in Cathcart. He served as a sergeant in the Highland Light Infantry during the war and was awarded the Military Medal during the course of his service. Kennedy was killed at Beaumont-Hamel on 18 November 1916 and was buried in Serre Road Cemetery No. 1.

== Career statistics ==
Appearances and goals by club, season and competition
Club	Season	League			Scottish Cup		Total	
Club	Season	Division	Apps	Goals	Apps	Goals	Apps	Goals
Arthurlie	1908–09	Scottish Second Division	4	1	0	0	4	1
Vale of Leven (loan)	1909–10	Scottish Second Division	1	0	0	0	1	0
Abercorn	1910–11	Scottish Second Division	10	0	0	0	10	0
Abercorn	1911–12	Scottish Second Division	2	0	0	0	2	0
Abercorn	1914–15	Scottish Second Division	13	1	—		13	1
Abercorn	Total		25	1	0	0	25	1
Career total			30	2	0	0	30	2
