= Gene Kennedy =

Gene Kennedy may refer to:

- Gene Kennedy (politician) (1927–2021), American politician
- Gene Kennedy (footballer) (born 2003), English footballer
