= Scott Kennedy =

Scott Kennedy may refer to:

- Scott Kennedy (political scientist) American political scientist and China specialist
- Scott Kennedy (comedian) (1965–2013), American stand-up comedian
- Scott Kennedy (soccer) (born 1997), Canadian soccer player
- Scott Hamilton Kennedy (born 1965), documentary director
- Scott Kennedy, lead vocalist of Bleed from Within
