= Gillian Dorothy Kennedy =

British speech and language therapist

Gillian Dorothy Kennedy FRCSLT OBE
- Occupation: speech therapist

Academic background
- Education: University of Edinburgh

Academic work
- Sub-discipline: Paediatric and neonatal care
- Institutions: University College Hospital

Gillian Dorothy Kennedy FRCSLT OBE is a Consultant speech and language therapist specialising in neonates and paediatrics at University College Hospital.

== Career ==
Kennedy undertook undergraduate study at the University of Edinburgh and a MSc at City, University of London. She is a Consultant speech and language therapist at University College Hospital, and one of two national trainers in NIDCAP (Newborn Individualised Developmental Care and Assessment Program). She teaches families and healthcare staff to recognise the importance of non-verbal communication in infants and is a national and international adviser and educator in the field.

She was elected a Fellow of the Royal College of Speech and Language Therapists in 2015 and was appointed an OBE in the 2015 Birthday Honours for services to speech therapy.
