= Alan Kennedy (disambiguation) =

Alan Kennedy (born 1954) is an English former footballer.

Alan Kennedy may also refer to:

- Alan Kennedy (hurler) (born 1987), Irish hurler
- Alan Kennedy (psychologist), British psychologist

== See also ==
- Allan Kennedy (born 1958), Canadian-born American football player
