= Duncan Kennedy =

Duncan Kennedy may refer to:

- Duncan Kennedy (legal philosopher) (born 1942), legal philosopher at Harvard Law School
- Duncan Kennedy (luger) (born 1967), American luger
- D. James Kennedy (1930–2007), American Christian broadcaster and church pastor
- Duncan Kennedy, BBC journalist
