= Rick Kennedy (historian) =

Rick Kenney (born 1958) is an American historian with interests in cultural and intellectual history, and the religious life in a secular world.

== Early life and education ==
Born in 1958 to Robert Kennedy (a professor at Hartnell College and former US Naval office) and Donna Jean Barber Kennedy (a church leader), Rick Kennedy grew up in Salinas, California. He started his undergraduate career at California Polytechnic State University, San Luis Obispo from 1976 to 1978 and then transferred to the University of California, Santa Barbara where he earned his B.A. in history in 1980. After working as an electrician briefly, he then returned to UCSB for his M.A. and Ph.D. in history at the University of California, Santa Barbara. Throughout his undergraduate and graduate study, Kennedy was active in several churches and Christian groups. His doctoral dissertation, entitled "Thy Patriarch's Desire: Thomas and William Brattle in Puritan Massachusetts," was directed by Harold Kirker.

== Career ==
After completing his Ph.D. in 1987, he accepted a call to Indiana University Southeast in New Albany, Indiana as assistant professor of History and in 1993 was promoted to Associate Professor and then moved to Point Loma Nazarene University in San Diego, California in 1995, where he moved through the ranks from Associate Professor to Full Professor.

== Personal life ==
Kennedy has given numerous talks and writes numerous blog posts. He is also an active sailor, and teaches students both in the classroom and on the high seas. Kennedy also serves as Elder of First Presbyterian Church in San Diego, California, where he also teaches adult Sunday school classes.

== Selected publications ==
- Rick Kennedy, "Thomas Brattle and the Provincialism of New England Science, 1690-1720," The New England Quarterly, 63 (1990): 584-600
- Rick Kennedy, "Thomas Brattle: A Mathematician-Architect in the Transition of the New England Mind, 1690-1700," Winterthur Portfolio, 24 (1989): 231-245
- Rick Kennedy, "The Alliance Between Puritanism and Cartesian Logic at Harvard," Journal of the History of Ideas, 51 (1990): 549- 572. Reprinted in The American Enlightenment, ed. Frank Shuffelton (Rochester NY: University of Rochester Press, 1993), 3-26, vol. 11 in the Library of the History of Ideas, series ed. John W. Yolton.
- Rick Kennedy, '"The Application of Mathematics to Christian Apologetics in Pascal's Pensées and Arnauld's The Port-Royal Logic," Fides et Historia, 23 (1991): 37-52
- Rick Kennedy, "Miracles in the Dock: A Critique of the Historical Profession's Special Treatment of Alleged Spiritual Events," Fides et Historia, 26 (1994): 7-22.
- Rick Kennedy, Aristotelian and Cartesian Logic at Harvard: Morton's "System of Logick" and Brattle's "Compendium of Logick" (Boston: Colonial Society of Massachusetts and Charlottesville: University Press of Virginia, 1995)
- Rick Kennedy, “Increase Mather’s Catechismus Logicus: A Translation and an Analysis of the Role of a Ramist Catechism at Harvard,” co-authored with Thomas Knoles, Proceedings of the American Antiquarian Society 109 (1999): 145–181.
- Rick Kennedy, Faith at State: A Handbook for Christians at Secular Universities (Downers Grove, IL: InterVarsity Press, 1995, reprint Eugene, OR: Wipf and Stock, 2002)
- Rick Kennedy, “Faith and History: Toward a Better Understanding of Balancing of Likelihoods,” Fides et Historia, 29 (1997): 66–73.
- Rick Kennedy, Student Notebooks at Colonial Harvard: Manuscripts and Educational Practice, 1650-1740, co-written with Thomas Knoles and Lucia Zaucha Knoles (Worcester, MA: American Antiquarian Society, 2003).
- Rick Kennedy, A History of Reasonableness: Testimony and Authority in the Art of Thinking (Rochester, NY: University of Rochester Press, 2004).
- Rick Kennedy, Jesus, History, and Mount. Darwin: An Academic Excursion (Eugene, OR: Wipf and Stock, 2008; Cambridge, UK: Lutterworth Press, 2008)
- Rick Kennedy, The First American Evangelical: A Short Life of Cotton Mather (Grand Rapids, MI: Wm. B. Eerdman's, 2015)
- Rick Kennedy, The Winds of Santa Ana: Pilgrim Stories of the California Bight (Eugene, OR: Wipf and Stock, 2022).
