= Jason Kennedy =

Jason Kennedy may refer to:

- Jason Kennedy (footballer) (born 1986), British football player
- Jason Kennedy (TV personality) (born 1981), American television personality, correspondent and co-anchor in E! News

== See also ==
- Jay Kennedy (1956–2007), American editor and writer
