= Kate Kennedy =

Kate Kennedy may refer to:

- Kate Kennedy (educator) (1827–1890), women's rights advocate
- Kate Kennedy (writer) (born 1977), British biographer and academic
- Kate Kennedy (Retreat), a fictional character from the 2011 film Retreat
- Kate Kennedy, a 1945 play by Gordon Bottomley
- Kate Kennedy, a character played by Myrna Loy on General Electric Theater
- Kate Kennedy (actress), British actress, television and film writer, and director

== See also ==
- Katherine Kennedy (disambiguation)
- Kathleen Kennedy (disambiguation)
