= Matthew Kennedy =

Matthew Kennedy may refer to:

- Matthew Kennedy (author) (born 1957), American author
- Matthew Kennedy (cricketer) (born 1991), South African cricketer
- Matthew Kennedy (footballer, born 1970), former Australian rules football player for Brisbane
- Matthew Kennedy (footballer, born 1997), current Australian rules football player for the Western Bulldogs
- Matthew Kennedy (rugby league) (born 1981), Australian rugby league player (Newcastle Knights)
- Matthew P. Kennedy (1908–1957), basketball referee
- Matthew Rauch Kennedy (born 1980), son of Joseph P. Kennedy II
- Matt Kennedy (born 1958), American footballer
- Matt Kennedy, part of Astron-6
- Matty Kennedy (born 1994), Northern Irish professional footballer
- Matthew Washington Kennedy (1921–2014), African-American classical pianist, professor and choral director
- Matthew Kennedy (architect), Kentucky architect
- Matthew Kennedy (figure skater), American pair skater
