= Mary Elizabeth Kennedy =

American artist

Mary Elizabeth Kennedy (1911–1991) is an American artist associated with the Gee's Bend group of quilters. Her work is included in the collection of the Metropolitan Museum of Art.

== Early life ==
Mary Elizabeth was born in Boykin, Alabama to Reverend Spurllin Pettway and his wife on a sharecropping and subsistence farm. Their main crops were cotton and sorghum. Kennedy married Houston Kennedy and they bore 12 children.

She died at 80 years old in a car crash returning to Boykin from Selma.
