= Ian Kennedy (disambiguation) =

Ian Kennedy (born 1984) is a baseball player.

Ian or Iain Kennedy may also refer to:

- Ian Kennedy (comics) (1932–2022), UK comic artist
- Ian Kennedy (legal scholar) (born 1941), British academic lawyer
- Iain Kennedy (rugby union) (born 1985), Scottish rugby union player
- Iain Kennedy (cricketer) (born 1960), Scottish cricketer
- Iain Kennedy (rower) (born 1950), Irish rower
