= Douglas Kennedy =

Douglas Kennedy may refer to:

- Douglas Kennedy (politician) (1916–2003), Canadian politician
- Douglas Kennedy (writer) (born 1955), American writer
- Douglas Kennedy (actor) (1915–1973), American actor
- Douglas Harriman Kennedy (born 1967), American broadcast journalist, son of Robert F. Kennedy
- Douglas Kennedy (folk dancer), English folk musician and dancer
- Doug Kennedy (public servant), New Zealand doctor and public servant
