= Terry Kennedy =

Terry Kennedy may refer to:

== Sports ==
- Terry Kennedy (baseball) (born 1956), American baseball player
- Terry Kennedy (footballer) (born 1993), English footballer
- Terry Kennedy (rugby union, born 1954), Irish rugby union player
- Terry Kennedy (rugby union, born 1996), Irish rugby union and sevens player
- Terry Kennedy (skateboarder) (born 1985), American skateboarder

== Others ==
- Terry Kennedy (politician), American politician
- Terry Kennedy (speaker) (born 1978), Australian motivational speaker
