= Ben Kennedy =

Ben Kennedy may refer to:

- Ben Kennedy (rugby league) (born 1974), Australian former rugby league footballer
- Ben Kennedy (Australian rules footballer), (born 1994), Australian footballer for Melbourne
- Ben Kennedy (soccer, born 1987), Australian football (soccer) goalkeeper
- Ben Kennedy (footballer, born 1997), Northern Irish professional football player
- Ben Kennedy (NASCAR) (born 1991), American stock car racing driver
- Benjamin Hall Kennedy (1804–1889), English scholar
