= Hugh Kennedy =

Hugh Kennedy may refer to:

- Hugh Kennedy (judge) (1879–1936), Attorney-General of Ireland and Chief Justice
- Hugh N. Kennedy (born 1947), professor in history of the Islamic Middle East
- Hugh Kennedy (New Orleans), mayor of New Orleans, 1865–1866
- Hugh Alexander Kennedy (1809–1878), British chess master and army captain
- Hugh Kennedy of Girvanmains, Scottish courtier, soldier, and landowner.
- Hugh W. Kennedy, Canadian politician from Ontario

== See also ==
- Hugh Kennedie, moderator of the General Assembly of the Church of Scotland, 1690–1692
