= Chris Kennedy =

Chris or Christopher Kennedy may refer to:

- Chris Kennedy (Colorado politician), member of the Colorado House of Representatives
- Chris Kennedy (filmmaker) (1948–2013), Australian filmmaker and writer
- Chris Kennedy (tennis) (born 1963), American professional tennis player
- Christopher Kennedy (music editor), British music editor
- Christopher G. Kennedy (born 1963), American businessman, son of Robert F. Kennedy

== See also ==
- Chris Kenady (born 1973), American professional ice hockey player
