= Grace Kennedy =

Grace Kennedy may refer to:

- GraceKennedy, Jamaican conglomerate
- Grace Kennedy (writer) (1782–1825), Scottish writer
- Grace Kennedy (singer), BBC British singer and television presenter
- Grace Kennedy (album), 1979 album of the singer Grace Kennedy
- Poto and Cabengo (Grace and Virginia Kennedy), American identical twins
