= Paddy Kennedy (Sligo Gaelic footballer) =

Irish Gaelic footballer

Personal information
- Born: 1926 Tourlestrane, Sligo, Ireland
- Died: April 2011

Sport
- Sport: Gaelic football
- Position: Full back
Club
- Years: Club
- Tourlestrane
Club titles
- Sligo titles: 1
Inter-county
- Years: County
- 1950s: Sligo
Inter-county titles
- Connacht titles: 1 Junior

Paddy Kennedy (1926-2011) was a Gaelic footballer from County Sligo. He played for the Sligo county team in the 1950s, winning a Connacht Junior Football Championship in 1956. He played his club football with the Tourlestrane club and helped them to a first Sligo Senior Football Championship in 1956. His two sons Fintan and Richard followed in their father's footsteps by winning senior championship medals with Tourlestrane in the 1990s.
