= Roisin Kennedy =

Irish art critic and curator

Dr. Róisín Kennedy is an Irish art critic and curator.

Kennedy is a graduate of University College Dublin and University of Edinburgh. She was awarded an Arts Council Bursary in Curatorship, in 1998, for which she curated and catalogued the historic and contemporary state collection at Dublin Castle, and wrote Dublin Castle Art. (1999). She is former Yeats Curator at the National Gallery of Ireland, (2006–08), where she curated The Fantastic in Irish Art and Masquerade and Spectacle: The Travelling Fair in the Work of Jack B. Yeats in 2007.

Kennedy's research focuses on the critical contexts of modernist art in Ireland. She completed an IRCHSS funded PhD entitled Politics of Vision: Critical Writing on Art in Ireland, 1939 -1972 in 2006. She has published widely on the subject in edited collections and in Circa, Irish Arts Review and Third Text. Her monography, Art and the Nation State. The Reception of Modern Art in Ireland was published by Liverpool University Press in 2021. She has co-edited several volumes on Irish and international art history including Harry Clarke and Artistic Visions of the New Irish State, Irish Academic Press, 2018; Censoring Art. Silencing the Artwork, I.B. Tauris, 2018 and Sources in Irish Art 2. A Reader, Cork University Press, 2021. She is lecturer in the School of Art History and Cultural Policy at University College Dublin.
