= Harry Kennedy =

Harry Kennedy may refer to:

- Harry Kennedy (politician) (born 1952), American politician in Missouri
- Harry Kennedy (songwriter) (1855–1894), ventriloquist and songwriter
- Harry S. Kennedy (1901–1986), bishop of Hawaii in the Episcopal Church
- Harry Kennedy, a fictional character played by Richard Armitage in The Vicar of Dibley
- Henry Lamb Kennedy (died 1933), Fijian politician

== See also ==
- Henry Kennedy (disambiguation)
- Harold Maurice Kennedy (1895–1971), U.S. federal judge
