= Ricardo Kennedy =

Argentine Politician

Ricardo C. Kennedy

Legislator by Buenos Aires Province Chamber of Deputies
- In office 1910–1911
- President: Roque Sáenz Peña

Personal details
- Born: 1867 Buenos Aires, Argentina
- Died: 1938 (aged 70–71) La Plata, Argentina
- Resting place: La Recoleta Cemetery
- Party: Partido Conservador
- Occupation: Politician
- Profession: Legal

Ricardo Kennedy (1867–1938) was an Argentine notary and politician who served as provincial legislator, and as Municipal Commissioner of the town of Rivadavia, province of Buenos Aires.

== Biography ==
Kennedy was born in Buenos Aires, the son of Alexander Kennedy, born in Ireland, and Ana Tabares, born in the Brazilian Empire. . He was the president of the College of Notaries of the Province in 1910, and served as a government notary between 1909 and 1938.

He was married to Josefa Monasterio, daughter of Martín Monasterio and Josefa Vieyra. His son, Martín Kennedy was married to Celia Amoedo, daughter of Joaquín Amoedo, grandson of Sinforoso Amoedo, and Lía Giráldez, belonging to a distinguished family.
