= Joseph Kennedy (disambiguation) =

Joseph P. Kennedy Sr. (1888–1969) was a United States businessman and political figure, and father of John F. Kennedy.

Other Josephs in his family:

- Joseph P. Kennedy Jr. (1915–1944), oldest son of Joseph P. Kennedy Sr.
- Joseph P. Kennedy II (born 1952), oldest son of Senator and Attorney General Robert F. Kennedy, and former U.S. Representative from Massachusetts (1987–1999)
- Joe Kennedy III (born 1980), son of Joseph P. Kennedy II, and former U.S. Representative from Massachusetts (2013–2021)

Joseph Kennedy may also refer to:

== Politics ==
- Joseph C. G. Kennedy (1813–1887), Whig politician, lawyer and journalist from Pennsylvania who supervised the U.S. Census for 1850 and 1860
- Joseph Phillip Kennedy (born 1945), Chief justice of the Supreme Court of Nova Scotia
- Joseph L. Kennedy (born 1971), American businessman and candidate in the 2010 United States Senate special election in Massachusetts
- Joe Kennedy (Georgia politician) (1930–1997), American politician from Georgia

== Sports ==
- Joe Kennedy (baseball) (1979–2007), American baseball pitcher
- Joe Kennedy (footballer) (1925–1986), English professional footballer
- Joe Kennedy (basketball) (born 1947), American basketball player for the Seattle SuperSonics
- Pat Kennedy (coach) (Joseph Patrick Kennedy, born 1952), American basketball coach
- Joseph A. Kennedy, football coach and plaintiff in the U.S. Supreme Court case Kennedy v. Bremerton School District

== Other ==
- X. J. Kennedy (Joseph Charles Kennedy, 1929–2026), American poet, author, editor and translator
- Joseph W. Kennedy (1916–1957), American chemist and co-discoverer of the element plutonium
- Joe Kennedy Jr. (violinist) (1923–2004), American jazz violinist
- Joe Kennedy (bishop) (born 1969), Scottish Anglican academic and Bishop of Burnley
- Joseph Kennedy (actor) (born 1981), English actor
- Joseph Kennedy (professor) (1928–2024), Hungarian-born professor of polymer science and chemistry

== See also ==
- Jo Kennedy (born 1962), Australian actress
