= Sara Beaumont Kennedy =

American writer (1859–1920)

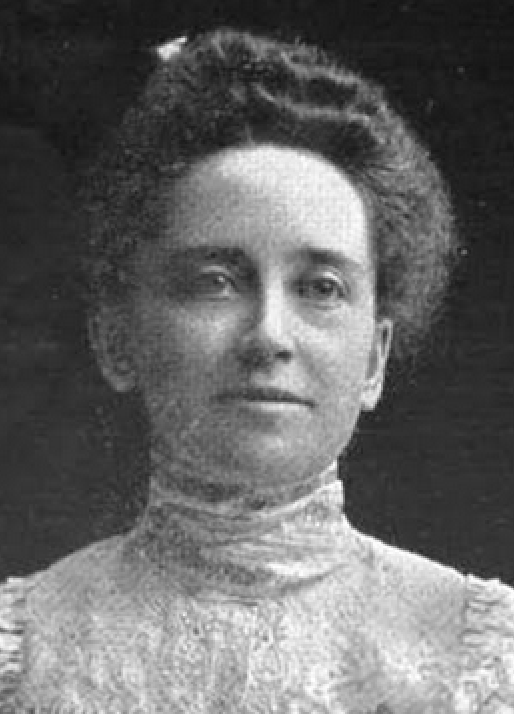
- Sara Beaumont Kennedy, from a 1902 publication
- Born: Sara Beaumont Cannon; 1859; Somerville, Tennessee
- Died: March 12, 1920 (aged 60–61); Memphis, Tennessee
- Occupations: Writer, editor
- Relatives: Mary Bayard Devereux Clarke (aunt)

Sara Beaumont Kennedy (1859 – March 12, 1920), born Sara Beaumont Cannon, was an American writer and newspaper editor.

== Early life ==
Cannon was born in Somerville, Tennessee, the daughter of Robert Hines Cannon and Nora Devereux Cannon. Her parents were both from North Carolina; her father was a doctor, and her mother was a teacher. One of her aunts was writer Mary Bayard Devereux Clarke. She counted among her ancestors Philip Livingston and William Samuel Johnson. She attended St. Mary's School in Raleigh, North Carolina.

== Career ==
Kennedy wrote in various genres, publishing poems, children's books, and historical fiction. She also wrote newspaper articles and short stories. She worked as an editor at the Memphis Commercial Appeal, a Tennessee newspaper. She was described as "the only woman paragrapher in the South". She lectured to women's organizations, and organized community groups. She was a member of the Daughters of the American Revolution. She favored prohibition and woman's suffrage.

== Selected publications by Sara Beaumont Kennedy ==
- "The Sign of the New Covenant" (1892)
- "The Master of Brookfield" (1896)
- The Assembly Ball (1897)
- Redcoat and Continental (1897)
- Doris: A Story of the Regulators (1898)
- A Christmas Message from Ocracoke: A Legend of Colonial Days (1900)
- "Colonial New Bern" (1901)
- The Wooing of Judith (1902)
- Joscelyn Cheshire: A Story of Revolutionary Days in the Carolinas (1902)
- "How Earl Hargis Went A-shopping" (1904)
- "When Tarleton Rode his Raid" (1904)
- "At the Old Horse Sale" (1905)
- Told in a Little Boy's Pocket (1908)
- Cicely; a Tale of the Georgia March (1911)
- One Wish, and other poems of love and life (1915)
- Poems (1919)

== Personal life ==
Cannon married fellow writer Walter Kennedy in 1888. Her husband died in 1909. She died in 1920. Nashville's Nineteenth Century Club held a "Friendship Day" in memory of Kennedy in December 1920. There is a collection of her papers in the collection of the Memphis Public Libraries.
