= Kennedy's Confection =

Monthly confectionery magazine

Kennedy's Confection, is a monthly magazine published by Kennedy's Publications that covers confectionery industry.

It has annual turnover of £500,000 a year.

== History ==
Confectionery News magazine was started in 1890. Kennedy's Confection was launched in 1990 and it is published on a monthly basis.

Cover

Angus Kennedy edited Kennedy's Confection magazine for 10 years.
