= Bob Kennedy (American football, born 1928) =

American football player (1928–1991)

No. 82
- Positions: Defensive back, halfback

Personal information
- Born: September 16, 1928; Weehawken, New Jersey, U.S.
- Died: July 5, 1991 (aged 62); Richwood, New Jersey, U.S.
- Listed height: 6 ft 0 in (1.83 m)
- Listed weight: 178 lb (81 kg)

Career information
- High school: Bergenfield (Bergenfield, New Jersey)
- College: North Carolina (1945–1948)
- NFL draft: 1949: 8th round, 78th overall pick

Career history
- Los Angeles Dons (1949)

Career AAFC statistics
- Rushing yards: 14
- Rushing average: 7
- Interceptions: 1
- Stats at Pro Football Reference

Robert Michael Kennedy (September 16, 1928 – July 5, 1991) was a professional American football defensive back and halfback in the All-America Football Conference (AAFC) for the Los Angeles Dons. He played college football at the University of North Carolina at Chapel Hill and was drafted 78th overall in the eighth round of the 1949 NFL draft by the Washington Redskins.
