= Mick Kennedy (Limerick hurler) =

Irish hurler

Personal information
- Native name: Mícheál Ó Cinnéide (Irish)
- Born: 1911 The Ragg, County Tipperary, Ireland
- Died: 14 May 1977 (aged 65–66) Johnsgate, Limerick, Ireland
- Occupation: Leather merchant
- Height: 5 ft 10 in (178 cm)

Sport
- Sport: Hurling
- Position: Left corner-back
Club
- Years: Club
- Young Irelands
Inter-county
- Years: County
- Limerick
Inter-county titles
- Munster titles: 4
- All-Irelands: 3
- NHL: 5

Michael Kennedy (1911 – 14 May 1977) was an Irish hurler who played as a full-back for the Limerick senior team.

== Career ==
Kennedy joined the team during the 1933 championship and was a regular member of the starting fifteen until his retirement almost a decade later. During that time he won three All-Ireland SHC medals, four Munster SHC medals and five National Hurling League medals. Kennedy was an All-Ireland SHC runner-up on one occasion.

At club level Kennedy played with Young Irelands.
