= Cathy Kennedy =

Cathy or Kathy Kennedy may refer to:

- Cathy Kennedy, editor of APC (magazine)
- Cathy Kennedy, character played by Patricia Brake
- Kathy Kennedy, US politician
- Kathy Kennedy, National Cowgirl Museum and Hall of Fame

== See also ==
- Catherine Kennedy (disambiguation)
