= Alfred J. Kennedy =

American politician

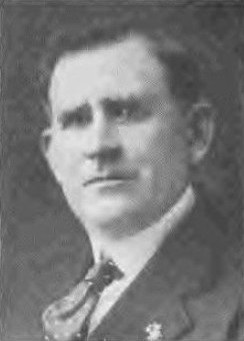
Kennedy in 1927

Alfred John Kennedy (August 13, 1877 – July 28, 1944) was an American politician from New York.

== Life ==
Born in Whitestone, Long Island before it became part of New York City, Kennedy fought as a corporal of the 22nd New York Infantry (U.S. Army) in the Spanish–American War. He married Annie Hanlon in 1900 and they had three sons.

Kennedy was a member of the New York State Assembly (Queens Co., 2nd D.) in 1911, 1912 and 1913; and was Chairman of the Committee on Privileges and Elections in 1913. He resigned his seat on May 12, 1913, to accept an appointment as Postmaster of Flushing, Queens. In the 1920 United States House of Representatives election, he unsuccessfully ran as the Democratic candidate for New York's 1st congressional district.

On December 22, 1922, Alfred J. Kennedy, his half-brother Robert R. Clancy (1901–1972), and his son Francis Kennedy, were indicted by a federal grand jury for violating the postal laws. Kennedy was accused of having leaked the questions (which had been sent by mail) for a civil service test.

He was again a member of the State Assembly (Queens Co., 3rd D.) in 1923, 1924, 1925 and 1926.

He was a member of the New York State Senate (3rd D.) from 1927 to 1930, sitting in the 150th, 151st, 152nd and 153rd New York State Legislatures. He filed his resignation on April 11, effective on May 1, 1930, and was appointed Public Administrator of Queens.

In August 1937, he was elected Commander-in-Chief of the United Spanish War Veterans.

He died on July 28, 1944 at Flushing Hospital; and was buried at the Long Island National Cemetery.

In 1950, an Alfred J. Kennedy Memorial was erected on the corner of Main and Northern streets in Queens.

In 1952, Public School No. 193 in Queens was named for him Alfred J. Kennedy School.

New York State Assembly
Preceded by Christian F. Weiland	New York State Assembly; Queens County, 2nd District; 1911–1913	Succeeded by Peter J. McGarry
Preceded by Joseph V. Loscalzo	New York State Assembly; Queens County, 3rd District; 1923–1926	Succeeded by Charles W. Posthauer
New York State Senate
Preceded by Peter J. McGarry	New York State Senate; 3rd District; 1927–1930	Succeeded by Frank B. Hendel
