= Andrew Karpati Kennedy =

Author and literary critic (1931–2016)

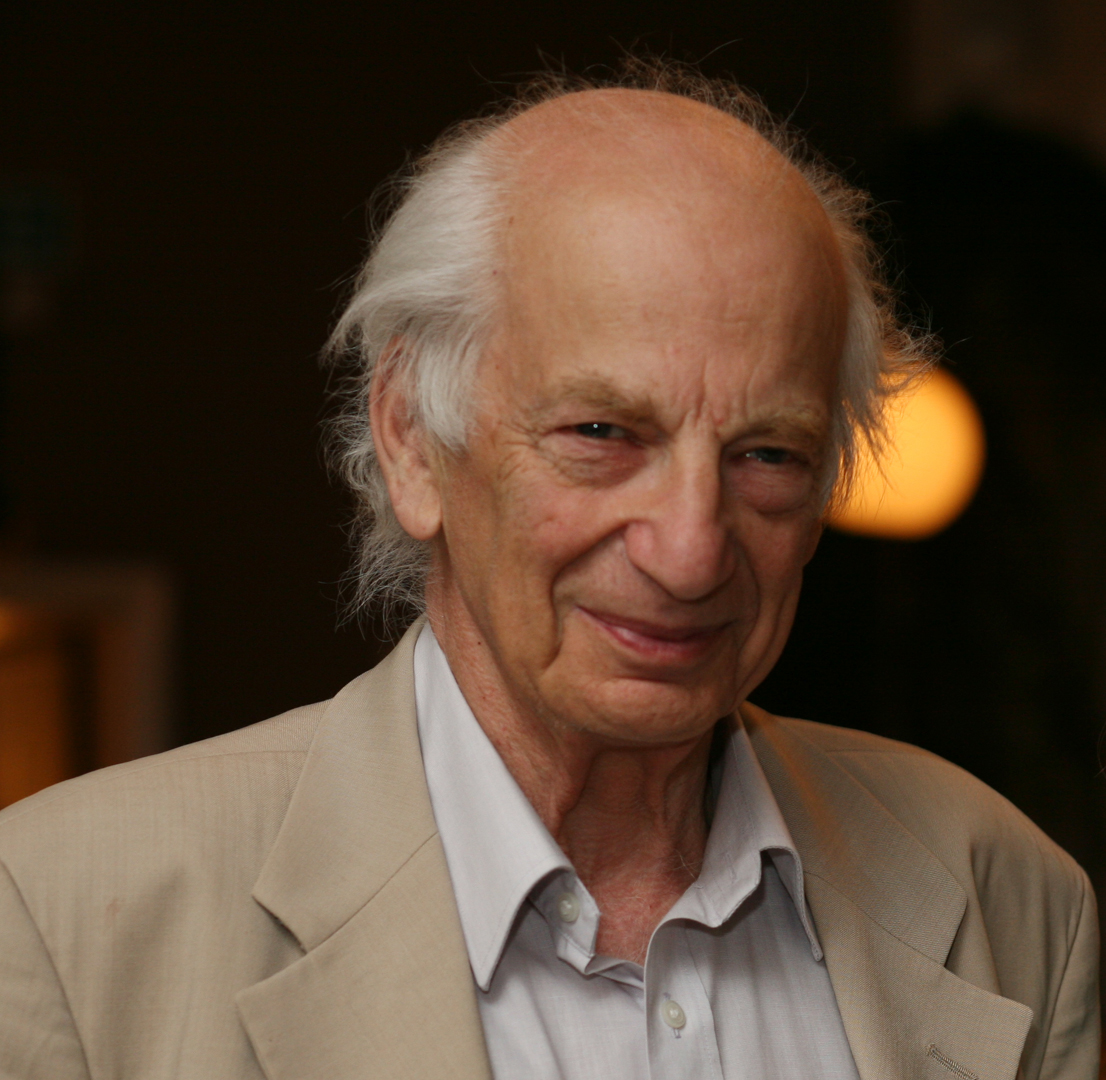
- Andrew Karpati Kennedy in 2009
- Born: Kárpáti Andor Ödön; 9 January 1931; Győr, Hungary
- Died: 20 December 2016 (aged 85); Cambridge, England
- Occupations: author and literary critic
- Notable work: Six Dramatists in Search of a Language; Chance Survivor
- Spouse: Judith Edmundson Hall (died 1992)
- Children: Veronica and Nicholas

Andrew Edmund Karpati Kennedy (born Kárpáti Andor Ödön; 9 January 1931 – 20 December 2016) was a Hungarian-born British author, literary critic and academic with a passionate interest in the language of drama.

== Biography ==
=== Early years ===
Born in Győr in the west of Hungary, Kennedy spent his early childhood in Debrecen, where his father was manager of the Credit Bank. He attended the Calvinist Gymnasium in Debrecen from September 1941 until the Nazi invasion of Hungary in March 1944.

=== The war years and post-war career ===
Following the Nazi invasion, Kennedy was deported not to Auschwitz as intended but to a camp on the outskirts of Vienna, where he was forced to work making anti-aircraft guns for Nazi Germany. After the war he returned to his studies, initially at his old school in Debrecen and then briefly in Budapest, attending the Fasori Gimnázium. While in Budapest he became an "avid theatre-goer", attending as many performances of plays and operas as he could afford, with his passion for the arts soon extending to concert-going and visits to the Museum of Fine Arts. In the autumn of 1947, when still only in his mid-teens, he moved to Ware in Hertfordshire, England, to stay with his uncle. He attended Hertford Grammar School and went on to read English literature and philosophy at the University of Bristol. There he was a regular contributor as theatre and art critic to the university's student newspaper Nonesuch News. After graduation, he spent a year in the Auvergne teaching English to students at a catering school in Clermont-Ferrand. He came back to England and took up a job in 1956 with the BBC Monitoring Service in London, working on the Hungarian desk. He taught English for at least a school year at Scarborough College in Scarborough, North Yorkshire. At around this time he met Judith Edmundson Hall (1935–1992), whom he wed in 1958. He settled in Cambridge, where he worked as a teacher of English as a second language before taking up an appointment as lecturer in the department of English at Bergen University, Norway in 1966. In 1972, he was awarded his doctorate on the languages of drama by the University of Bristol. In 1990, he became professor of British literature at Bergen. He was a visiting scholar at the universities of Edinburgh, Washington and Princeton, and in 1979–80 a visiting fellow at Clare Hall, Cambridge, where he became a Life Member.

Kennedy died in Cambridge on 20 December 2016.

== Writings ==
"Andrew Kennedy's contribution to the field of literature has been substantial and spans several literary genres to which he has contributed both as a critic and as creative writer." Whether writing literary criticism or a short story, Kennedy employed great economy of style, something he admired in Strindberg's Ghost Sonata, for example. The final duologue between the Student and the Young Lady, asserted Kennedy, "compresses a whole cycle of relationship – love, marriage and death – within the cycle of one sustained encounter."

Both his book Six Dramatists in Search of a Language (1975, in which Kennedy explores the use of language by the playwrights Shaw, Eliot, Beckett, Pinter, Osborne and Arden) and Samuel Beckett were funded by grants from the Norwegian Research Council for Science and the Humanities (Norges Almenvitenskappelige Forskningsråd).

In a prefatory remark to The Antique Dealer's Women, George Steiner writing about Kennedy's earlier book Double Vision declared that Kennedy's stories "are vignettes of insightful and humane understanding. They are of a concise maturity all too rare in the current climate of narrative." Writing about his novella The Antique Dealer's Women, Elaine Feinstein was full of praise: "The prose is so elegant, so sensuous, so assured. Wonderful writing."

== Bibliography ==
=== Works of criticism ===
- Six Dramatists in Search of a Language Cambridge: Cambridge University Press, 1975 ISBN 978-0-521-20492-7 (cloth) ISBN 978-0-521-09866-3 (paperback) OCLC 1323859
- Dramatic Dialogue: The Duologue of Personal Encounter Cambridge: Cambridge University Press, 1983 ISBN 978-0-521-28845-3 OCLC 8346125
- Samuel Beckett Cambridge: Cambridge University Press (British and Irish Authors: Introductory Critical Studies), 1989 ISBN 978-0-521-25482-3 (cloth) ISBN 978-0-521-27488-3 (paperback) OCLC 18743183 and OCLC 243385898
- Excursions in Fiction: Essays in Honour of Professor Lars Hartveit on his 70th birthday (Andrew Kennedy and Orm Øverland, eds.) Oslo: Novus Forlag (Studia Anglistica Norvegica, 6), 1994 ISBN 978-82-7099-224-9 OCLC 31987454

=== Short fiction and memoirs ===
- No title [but referred to as "The Deportation Train" in Chance Survivor], Observer, 16 July 1961, ISSN 0029-7712 OCLC 905673558, p. 21 (published under the name Andrew Karpati)
- Double Vision (a collection of fifteen short stories) Cambridge: Meadows Press, 1999 ISBN 978-0-9536731-0-0 OCLC 44014061
- The Antique Dealer’s Women: Confessions Cambridge: Meadows Press, 2006 ISBN 978-0-9536731-1-7 OCLC 82169385
- Chance Survivor Bristol: Old Guard Press, Shearsman Books Ltd, 2012 ISBN 978-1-84861-190-0 OCLC 824602069. A memoir from his childhood and youth in Hungary to his being a student in England.

Besides his literary criticism (books, conference papers and critical essays), Kennedy also published poems and short stories.

== Honours and awards ==
Lie, Ulf and Rønning, Anne Holden (eds.) Dialoguing on Genres. Essays in Honour of Andrew K. Kennedy on his 70th Birthday 9 January 2001, incl. "Andrew K[arpati] Kennedy: A Bibliography" compiled by Maya Thee. Oslo: Novus Forlag, 2001 ISBN 978-82-7099-326-0 OCLC 49679900

In the book's foreword Lie and Rønning write: "The editors undertook this project in appreciation of Andrew's love of literature, his contribution to it as author and critic and his readiness to discuss it and help others appreciate it, students as well as colleagues."
