= Mick Kennedy (Offaly hurler) =

Irish hurler

Personal information
- Native name: Mícheál Ó Cinnéide (Irish)
- Born: Birr, County Offaly, Ireland
- Occupation: Roman Catholic priest

Sport
- Sport: Hurling
- Position: Full-back
Club
- Years: Club
- Birr
Club titles
- Offaly titles: 0
Inter-county*
Years	County	Apps (scores)
1975–1981	Offaly	13 (0-00)
Inter-county titles
- Leinster titles: 2
- All-Irelands: 1
- NHL: 0
- All Stars: 0
- *Inter County team apps and scores correct as of 14:29, 28 June 2014.

Michael Kennedy (born 1950) is an Irish Catholic priest and former hurler from Birr, County Offaly, who played as a full-back for the Offaly senior team.

== Family and early life ==
Kennedy was one of 11 children of a CIÉ bus inspector distantly related to the Kennedy family of American politics. Of Michael's brothers, two died in childhood, one became a priest in Central America and another (Declan aka "Wally") was elected to Hillingdon London Borough Council for Militant Labour in 1990. After the Leaving Certificate, Michael entered Donamon Castle, the seminary of the Society of the Divine Word, intending to become a missionary priest, but left to get treatment for a stammer. At the 1974 local elections he was elected to Birr urban district council for Provisional Sinn Féin, resigning after 15 months to enter St Patrick's College, Maynooth, from where he was ordained as a secular priest in 1981.

== Hurling ==
External image
- 1981 Offaly squad. Kennedy 2nd right in the top row

Kennedy first played competitive hurling in his youth. At club level he played for Birr. He made his senior inter-county debut during the 1975 All-Ireland Championship and immediately became a regular member of the team. In the 1980 Championship, he played in the Leinster and All-Ireland finals, gaining winner's and loser's medals respectively. In 1981 he won a second Leinster and first All-Ireland medal an unused substitute in both finals. Questioned by Mick Dunne after the latter, he said "I drank, I smoked, I prayed."

Kennedy retired as an intercounty player after his 1981 ordination. While stationed in Clonmel he played for St Mary's, reaching the South Tipperary Senior Championship final in 1988. Later he commuted to Birr to train the club team, taking them to the 1993 Offaly Senior Championship final.

== Priesthood ==
External images
- In his churchyard during the 1995 AIDS controversy
- In Hyannis Port in 1999 with Ethel Kennedy
- On The Late Late Show in 1999

While Birr is in the Diocese of Killaloe, locals believed bishop Michael Harty's opposition to Sinn Féin impelled Kennedy to seek curacies in the Diocese of Waterford and Lismore: first Clonmel, then Grangemockler, and from 1994 Dungarvan. He had a reputation of being sincere and outspoken but somewhat impulsive.

He associated with his American relatives. When Jean Kennedy Smith was U.S. ambassador to Ireland, he officiated at the wedding of her daughter Kym, and that of her niece Courtney Kennedy to Paul Hill of the Guildford Four, and the 1998 funeral of Michael LeMoyne Kennedy in Brookline, Massachusetts. In July 1999, he was at the Kennedy Compound for Rory's wedding when John F. Kennedy Jr. was killed en route. He described the events weeks later as a guest on Pat Kenny's first episode of The Late Late Show.

=== 1995 AIDS story ===
A sermon Kennedy preached at two masses in Dungarvan on 10 September 1995 caused a sensation. He claimed an unnamed local woman who had emigrated to London ten years previously had returned after testing HIV positive and was having casual sex in a bid to infect as many men as possible, with five having already tested positive and scores more awaiting results. Journalist John Murphy was in the congregation and reported the story in the following day's Cork Examiner; it was picked up by national and international media. Kennedy's parish priest and bishop told him to share any information with the local health board. No corroborating evidence emerged and Kennedy continually revised his account. The consensus was that the story was statistically impossible and an urban myth of the AIDS panic. Feminists criticised it as propagating a temptress stereotype. Rumours named two different women as the "Angel of Death" or "AIDS Avenger", one of whom later alleged harassment in subsequent months. In 2000, The Atlantic Monthly published a short story based on the incident. In 2007 Kennedy was reported to be still insisting on the veracity of his claims.

=== Subsequent career ===
In early 1996, during the Northern Ireland peace process, Kennedy preached against IRA "men of violence". In 2001 he was made parish priest of Dunhill/Fenor. In October 2006 two drug addicts he had befriended were convicted of making unwarranted demands with menace for money, after a 2003 threat to falsely accuse him of sexual abuse. Kennedy had been suspended from ministry after reporting the 2003 threat. He spent time in Canada but returned to Dunhill in early 2006 and began saying Mass in defiance of his suspension. He was placed on administrative leave in June 2006 and in 2007 he was in St. John of God Hospital, Stillorgan. In 2009 the church ordered him to vacate Dunhill parochial house and move to a church-owned house in nearby Ballylaneen. Parishioners were reportedly divided, some supporting Kennedy and others Bishop William Lee. In 2016 a church spokesman said Kennedy was "subject to a monitoring programme involving both the diocesan authorities and the Gardaí" but had not been laicised.
