= Timothy M. Kennedy (general) =

United States Army general

Timothy M. Kennedy is a retired brigadier general in the National Guard of the United States and former Assistant Adjutant General of Operations of the Minnesota Army National Guard.

== Career ==
Kennedy first enlisted in the National Guard in 1970. He was commissioned an officer in 1979. Awards he has received include the Meritorious Service Medal with oak leaf cluster, the Army Commendation Medal with oak leaf cluster, the Army Achievement Medal, the Army Reserve Components Achievement Medal with one silver oak leaf cluster and two bronze oak leaf clusters, the National Defense Service Medal, the Armed Forces Reserve Medal with gold hourglass device, and the Army Service Ribbon.

== Education ==
- B.S. – Physical Education, University of Wisconsin–Madison
