= Kennedy Ihenacho =

Nigerian footballer

Personal information
- Full name: Kennedy Ihenacho
- Date of birth: December 16, 1990 (age 35)
- Place of birth: Owerri, Nigeria
- Height: 1.85 m (6 ft 1 in)
- Position: Defender

Team information
- Current team: Burgan SC
- Number: 29

Youth career
- 2006–2008: Pepsi Football Academy
- 2008–2009: Campos Football Academy

Senior career*
Years	Team	Apps	(Gls)
2009	Niger Tornadoes FC	10	(2)
2010	Dolphins FC	17	(4)
2011–2012	Roi Et FC	47	(10)
2013	VSI TAMPA BAY FC	10	(3)
2014–2015	Burgan SC	28	(0)
- * Club domestic league appearances and goals

Kennedy Ihenacho // (born December 16, 1990) is a Nigerian former footballer. He moved to Kuwait after his contract expiration with the VSI TAMPA BAY FC in the United States USL league 2013 season. Kennedy Ihenacho has played for Roi Et FC in Thailand, Niger Tornadoes FC and Dolphins FC both in Nigeria.

== Career ==
Kennedy received his football education in the famous Pepsi Football Academy in Nigeria after graduation from the academy he started his first professional exhibition by playing for Niger Tornadoes FC and Dolphins FC in the Nigerian Premier League. Based on his ambition to face bigger challenges in his career he was spotted by an agent that took him to the Thai league where he secured a two years contract. Kennedy Ihenacho after his contract expiration jetted into the United States on an invitation by the United States indoor soccer giants the Milwaukee Wave Indoor soccer club where he played for a few months and later settled in a short-term contract with the VSI Tampa Bay FC in the USL.

== Position ==
Kennedy's preferred role is in the central defense and also a utility is the defense. He showcases his interceptions and timing in tackles and his aerial dominance, and possesses a playing trademark as an attacking sweeper and scores almost in every game.
