= EJJ =

EJJ may refer to:

== People ==
- EJJ Spamer, counsel in Wightman t/a JW Construction v Headfour
- EJJ Browell, County Durham civil servant and subject of Thomas Eyre Macklin painting

== Other ==
- EJJ Films, co-producer of 2026 film Terbang with Astro Shaw
