= Alys Martha Philpot =

English journalist, translator and publisher

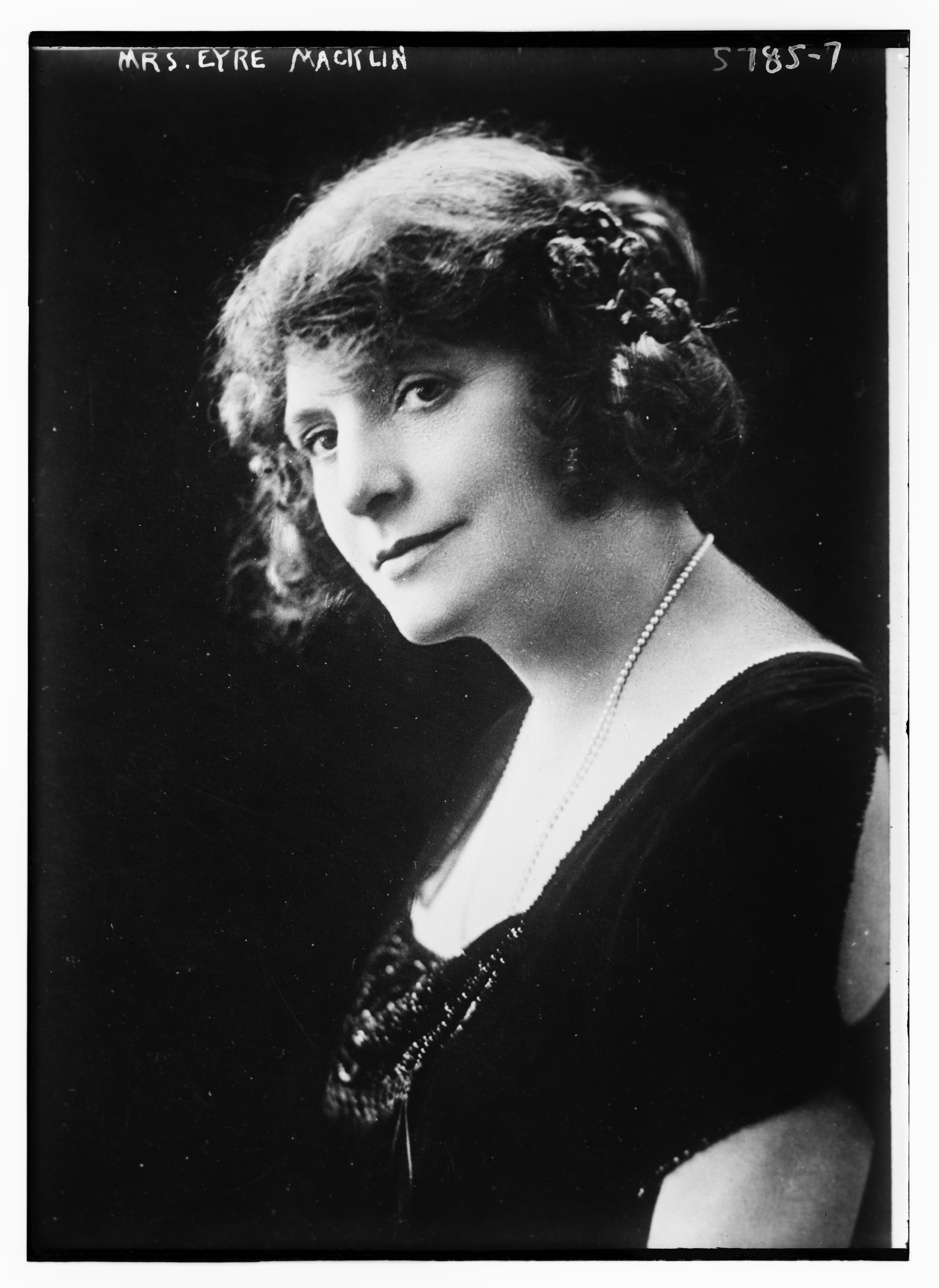
- Born: January 1866; Shoreditch, London, England
- Died: 19 January 1929 (aged 63); Bloomsbury, London, England
- Spouse: Thomas Eyre Macklin

Alys Martha Philpot (January 1866-19 January 1929) was an English journalist, translator and one of the first female publishers in London through her company A.M. Philpot Limited.

== Early life ==
Alice ‘Alys’ Martha Philpot was born in 1866 in Shoreditch, London, the daughter of John Edward Philpot (1838-1910), a commercial traveller, and his wife Martha, née Walker.

== Career ==
Between 1890 and 1893, the year she got married, she wrote feature articles under the pseudonym 'Margery Lee' for newspapers in Newcastle, particularly for the Literary Supplement of The Newcastle Weekly Chronicle.

By 1910, she was a member of the Poetry Society. In 1918 Philpot edited a collection of war poems and provided a preface to The Lyceum Book of War Verse.

In 1921, Philpot bought the business of McBride, Nast and Co. and started the publishing company A.M. Philpot Limited in premises on Great Russell Street, London. This company published her translations of French short stories or novels in a series called ‘’Les Fleurs du France’’ by writers such as Maurice Level, Maurice Rostand, and Henri Duvernois The company also published novels by women writers such as Grace Ellison, Eliza Humphreys, Joan Kennedy and Mary Fullerton.

In 1922, Philpot offered advance royalties of £250 for the best story of ‘self-revelation’ submitted anonymously, the idea being to have people tell the actual stories of their lives. The stories of two women were published in 1923 followed by stories of two men in 1924.

== Personal life ==
On 25 November 1893, Alys Philpot married the painter and sculptor Thomas Eyre Macklin at St Margaret’s Church, Westminster. She was said to have been the model for some of her husband’s best work.

In 1895, Alys Eyre Macklin and her husband were living in Brittany, France. She had two sons, Garnett, born in 1895 and Ronald, born in 1900.

In 1917, her husband left her and she applied for a decree for the restoration of conjugal rights, which he did not comply with. The couple were divorced in November 1918 because of her husband’s infidelity.

Philpot died on 19 January 1929 in Bloomsbury, London aged 63.
