= Elizabeth Cameron (disambiguation) =

Elizabeth Cameron may refer to:

- Elizabeth Cameron, American national security expert
- Elizabeth Cameron (editor) (1851–1929), Canadian magazine editor
- Elizabeth Cameron Dalman (born 1934), Australian choreographer, teacher, and performer
- Elizabeth Cameron Mawson (1849–1939), English painter
