= Joan Kennedy (novelist) =

English journalist and novelist

- Born: 12 April 1884; Shutford, Oxfordshire, England
- Died: 28 August 1965 (aged 81); St. Helier, Jersey
- Spouse: Hans Hamilton Morrison

Joan Kennedy was the pseudonym of Mabel Alice Morrison, née Gibbs (born Shutford, Oxfordshire, 12 April 1884; died St. Helier, Jersey, 28 August 1965), who was an English journalist and writer of more than 70 romance novels.

== Early life ==
Mabel Alice Gibbs was the third of eight children born at Shutford, Oxfordshire, to John Kennedy Gibbs, a carpenter and wheelwright, and his wife, Sarah Tustain Gibbs, née Ward.

Two of her sisters were also reported to make a living by writing: Violet Louisa Gibbs (1880–1966), who wrote novels and articles under her married name, Mrs Stanley Wrench; and Nell Winifred Kennedy Gibbs (1895–1969), the wife of Frank J. Lamburn (1872–1935), an editor of Pearson's Weekly. Another sister, Muriel Gibbs (1890–1976), submitted essays and stories to The Gentlewoman, a weekly magazine for women. Her niece, Margaret Stanley-Wrench (1916–1974), was a poet.

== Career ==
Gibbs started in journalism writing articles on flower arranging for the Daily Chronicle in 1913. By 1915, she was writing articles for women readers under the name Joan Kennedy for the Evening News. Kennedy's by-line first appeared in the Sunday Mirror in May 1916, but she didn't write regularly for the newspaper until 1919. As a female journalist, she was able to interview many female actors of the day, including Tallulah Bankhead and Mary Pickford. She also reported that she wrote opinion articles for newspapers under the name of her grandfather.

Kennedy's first book, entitled Sun, Sand and Sin (Hodder & Stoughton, 1916), was about the German military campaign in South West Africa and was based entirely on the recollections of the son of a neighbour in London. She reported that General Botha had demanded the book's withdrawal from sale in South Africa.

In the early 1920s, Kennedy did some radio broadcasts from London on station 2LO, the predecessor of the BBC.

Kennedy's first novel, The Muck Pond, was published in 1923 by the first woman publisher in London, A. M. Philpot. Kennedy then wrote 36 more romance novels before 1941, most published by John Long Ltd and Hutchinson. She also wrote two books about the role and status of women in society, This Marriage Business (John Long, 1935) and A Torch on Woman (Hutchinson, 1938). Kennedy's novel Dusty Measure (John Long, 1934) was prohibited in Ireland for reasons of indecency.

After being isolated in Jersey during the German occupation of the Channel Islands between 1940 and 1945, Kennedy returned to writing romance novels in 1947. She wrote another 37 novels published by Hutchinson, Pearson, and Hurst and Blackett, the last one published in 1966, the year after her death. In 1952, she published an autobiographical book of reminiscences entitled Myself the Pilgrim (Hutchinson).

== Personal life ==
In October 1920, Kennedy married a Canadian, Hans Hamilton Morrison (1882–1956), whose first wife had died in 1914. She was a member of the executive Committee of the Lyceum Club, one of the few clubs only for women in London.

In the 1930s, the couple moved to Jersey in the Channel Islands, where Morrison's ancestors had originally come from. Kennedy set two novels in Jersey: Earthenware (Hutchinson, 1937) and Bird of Brass (Hutchinson, 1940). The couple remained in Jersey during the German occupation from 1940 to 1945, a difficult time which she described in her reminiscences.

Joan Kennedy Morrison died in hospital in Jersey after a car accident on 28 August 1965, aged 81.
