= Maurice Level =

French writer

Maurice Level (29 August 1875 – 15 April 1926) was a French writer of fiction and drama who specialized in short stories of the macabre which were printed regularly in the columns of Paris newspapers and sometimes staged by le Théâtre du Grand-Guignol, the repertory company in Paris's Pigalle district devoted to melodramatic productions which emphasized blood and gore.

Many of Level's stories have been translated into American newspapers since 1903, notably his well-known tale "The Debt-Collector" (at least eight different translations). Between 1917 and 1919 the literary editor of the New York Tribune, William L. McPherson (1865-1930), translated seventeen war tales (three of them anonymously), seven of them being collected in Tales of Wartime France (1918). In 1920, English journalist, editor and publisher Alys Eyre Macklin (ca. 1875-1929) arranged a treaty with Level to be his official literary agent for all English-language countries ., and translated a selection of 26 tales as Crises, Tales of Mystery and Horror (1920). Nine of them have been first published by Hearst's Magazine in New York in 1919-1920. Some other tales appeared later in various newspapers or magazines in England or in the USA, such as Pan (London), or in the well-known pulp magazine Weird Tales.

H. P. Lovecraft observed of Level's fiction in his essay Supernatural Horror in Literature (1927): "This type, however, is less a part of the weird tradition than a class peculiar to itself — the so-called conte cruel, in which the wrenching of the emotions is accomplished through dramatic tantalizations, frustrations and gruesome physical horrors". Critic Philippe Gontier wrote: "We can only admire, now almost one hundred years later, the great artistry with which Maurice Level fabricated his plots, with what care he fashioned all the details of their unfolding and how with a master's hand he managed the building of suspense".

Thanks to Lovecraft, Maurice Level has been recognized in the United States and also in Japan as a minor master of the horrible, when he was forgotten in his own country, France during the major part of the 20th century. He was still in print in both these countries in the years 2000. Since 2017, various new editions of his works have been reissued in France, with new critical material.

== Selected works in French ==
- L'épouvante: Roman (1908) novel, translated as Terror (newspaper serial, US, 1908–09) The Grip of Fear (UK, 1909; US, 1911)
- Les Portes de l'Enfer (1910), (meaning “The Gates of Hell”) short stories
- Les Oiseaux de nuit (1913) short stories
- Mado ou les mille joies du ménage (1914) humorous sketches
- Vivre pour la patrie (1917) novel
- L'Alouette: Roman (1918)
- Mado ou la Guerre à Paris (1919) humorous sketches
- Le Manteau d'arlequin: Roman (1919)
- Barrabas: Roman (1920)
- L'Ombre: Roman (1921) Novel translated as The Shadow (UK, 1923) Those who return (US, 1923)
- Le Crime: Roman (1921)
- Au pays du Tendre (1921)
- Les morts étranges (1921) short stories
- L'Île sans nom (1922)
- L'Ame de minuit (serial, 1923; first book publication in 2017, Lulu.com, ISBN 978-0-244-90407-4)
- La Cité des voleurs: Roman (1924)
- Le Marchand de secrets (1928)
- L'Egnime de Bellavista (1928) prequel to Le Marchand de secrets
- Contes du Matin 1921-1924, sous la direction littéraire de Colette, preface by Jean-Luc Buard, La Bibliothèque Maurice Level/The International Maurice Level Library, 2017 (ISBN 978-0-244-00340-1)
- Contes de guerre 1914-1922, edited by Jean-Luc Buard, AARP/Centre Rocambole/Encrage, 2017 (ISBN 978-2-36058-168-9)
- Un maniaque et autres contes de l'Auto, 1904-1910, preface by Jean-Luc Buard, "La Bibliothèque Maurice Level"/Lulu.com, 2018 (ISBN 978-0-244-66494-7). Of this collection, the story mentioned in the title (Un maniaque, “A madman”) was published in an anthology of stories collected by Marvin Kaye called “Devils and Demons” (ISBN 978-0-385-18563-9). It was translated and edited by Marvin Kaye.

== Selected works in English ==
- The Grip of Fear (1909)
- Crises: Tales of Mystery and Horror (UK, 1920) 26 short stories translated by Alys Eyre Macklin
  - a.k.a. Tales of Mystery and Horror (US, 1920)
  - a.k.a. Grand Guignol Stories (UK, 1922)
- Those Who Return (1923) translated by Bérengère Drillien
- Stories of Fear and Fascination: The Fiction of Maurice Level (2007) edited by John Robert Colombo with appreciations by Philippe Gontier, Battered Silicon Dispatch Box.
- Thirty Hours with a Corpse, And Other Tales of the Grand Guignol (2016) edited and introduced by S.T. Joshi. (Dover Publications, 2016)
- Crises, vol. 1: Tales of Mystery and Horror and Ten Other Uncollected Short Stories, Bordeaux, Mad Sheep, 2017, 232 p. (ISBN 978-2-36183-479-1), with afterword "Alys Eyre Macklin, Maurice Level's English Friend and Translator" by Jean-Luc Buard. New enlarged and illustrated edition of 1920 collection
