= Wightman t/a JW Construction v Headfour =

South African legal case

Wightman t/a JW Construction v Headfour (Pty) Ltd and Another is an important case in South African law, heard in the Supreme Court of Appeal on February 27, 2008. Mpati DP, Cameron JA, Heher JA, Ponnan JA and Mhlantla AJA presided. Judgment was handed down on March 10, 2008. Counsel for the appellant was EJJ Spamer; SC Goddard appeared for the respondents. The appellant's attorneys were Kyriacos & Co, Cape Town, and Webbers, Bloemfontein. The respondents' Attorneys were EQM Hunter, Cape Town, and Honey Attorneys, Bloemfontein. The case was an appeal from a decision of the full bench in the Cape Provincial Division (Thring J, Blignaut J and Bozalek J) regarding spoliation.

The court considered, first, the requirements for a mandament van spolie. What was required was unlawful dispossession of property, not necessarily accompanied by violence or fraud, provided that the property was taken without the consent of the person dispoiled, and also illicitly, in a manner not countenanced by the law.

The court also dealt with the question of whether or not possession of the keys to property could be considered to amount to possession of that property. It found that to make duplicate keys available to another does not always amount to giving up physical possession of the property in question

The party raising a dispute of fact in motion proceedings, the court found, must seriously and unambiguously address that fact. This will indicate that the dispute is real, genuine or bona fide. If the disputing party necessarily possesses the knowledge and ability to show the facts in question to be untrue or inaccurate, but nonetheless fails to do so, instead resting on a bare or ambiguous denial, there is no bona fide dispute of fact.

== Facts ==
The appellant was a building contractor who had entered into an agreement with the first respondent (represented by the second respondent) to perform certain construction work on the first respondent's property. He was placed in possession of a full set of keys to the premises upon commencement of the work and subsequently delivered duplicates of certain of the keys to the second respondent for the limited purpose of facilitating inspection of the premises by the respondent.

When a dispute arose between the parties, the respondent engaged other contractors to complete the work and, using the duplicate keys delivered to him by the appellant, provided the new contractors with access to the premises. When the appellant thereafter arrived at the premises, he was refused access, apparently on the respondent's instructions. The appellant contended that this constituted spoliation and unsuccessfully applied for restitution ante omnia, and for ejectment of the second respondent.

== Judgment ==
On appeal, the court held as follows:

A real, genuine and bona fide dispute of fact can exist only where the court is satisfied that the party who purports to raise the dispute has in his affidavit seriously and unambiguously addressed the fact said to be disputed. There will of course be instances where a bare denial meets the requirement because there is no other way open to the disputing party and nothing more can therefore be expected of him. But even that may not be sufficient if the fact averred lies purely within the knowledge of the averring party and no basis is laid for disputing the veracity or accuracy of the averment. When the facts averred are such that the disputing party must necessarily possess knowledge of them and be able to provide an answer (or countervailing evidence) if they be not true or accurate but, instead of doing so, rests his case on a bare or ambiguous denial the court will generally have difficulty in finding that the test is satisfied. I say I "generally" because factual averments seldom stand apart from a broader matrix of circumstances all of which needs to be borne in mind when arriving at a decision. A litigant may not necessarily recognise or understand the nuances of a bare or general denial as against a real attempt to grapple with all relevant factual allegations made by the other party. But when he signs the answering affidavit, he commits himself to its contents, inadequate as they may be, and will only in exceptional circumstances be permitted to disavow them.

In the previous paragraph, it found that

an applicant who seeks final relief on motion must, in the event of conflict, accept the version set up by his opponent unless the latter's allegations are, in the opinion of the court, not such as to raise a real, genuine or bona fide dispute of fact or are so far-fetched or clearly untenable that the court is justified in rejecting them merely on the papers.

Violence or fraud, the court found, was not an essential act of dispossession, provided that the act was done against the consent of the person despoiled, and illicitly, meaning in a manner which the law would not countenance.

The mere fact of making duplicate keys available to another (who happened to be the owner of the premises) did not always equate to the giving up of physical possession.

Accordingly, on the facts, the court decided that the appellant had not lost physical possession of the premises by delivering the duplicate keys to the respondent. He was, however, dispossessed when the respondent used the keys illicitly and against his consent to provide the new contractors with access to the premises. The appeal was therefore upheld and the decision of Thring J (Blignault J concurring and Bozalek J dissenting), in Wightman t/a JW Construction v Headfour (Pty) Ltd and Another, reversed.
