= Grace Ellison =

British journalist

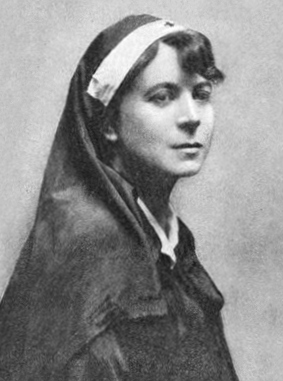
- from a 1919 publication
- Born: 13 May, 1880; Gravesend
- Died: 3 October, 1935; Franciscan Hospital in Berlin
- Occupations: journalist and travel writer
- Writing career
- Genre: travel
- Subject: Turkey et al

Grace Mary Ellison (13 May 1880 – 3 October 1935) was a British journalist. She wrote several books about Turkey. Though not herself a trained nurse, she was founder of the French Flag Nursing Corps during World War I.

== Early life ==
Grace Mary Ellison was born in Gravesend, Kent, on 13 May 1880, the daughter of Jane Young (born Watson) and Captain John Ellison. She credited her father's stories of sailing to India as inspiring her travelling career. She was educated in England at Rochester Girls' Grammar School, and in France, and at the University of Halle.

== Career ==
Ellison was a journalist especially interested in Turkey. She befriended Turkish sisters Hatice Zennur and Nuriye Nur-el-Nisa, in 1905. Using their pseudonyms, she edited and co-wrote English-language books with them, Zeyneb Hanoum's A Turkish Woman’s European Impressions (1913, a memoir) and Melek Hanoum's Abdul Hamid's Daughter (1913, a novel). Whilst travelling in Turkey in 1908-1909 and 1912–1913, Ellison wrote articles for The Daily Telegraph. She advocated for women students to gain access to college classes in Constantinople. She was awarded the Order of Charity (Şefkat Nişanı) for her efforts on behalf of women in Turkey. She reported on the Second Hague Conference (1907) and was continental reporter for the Bystander.

In 1914, several European countries went to war including Britain, Germany and France. The French army could lose tens of thousands in a day as their tacticians failed to take account of the German mechanised machine guns. Those who were wounded had to face a medical service that was overwhelmed. One commentator found an abandoned railway truck full of wounded soldiers who just wanted somewhere dignified to die. Ellison rose to the challenge and she went to see the French authorities. She offered to supply 300 trained British nurses. These would not be volunteers but they would be paid by the French. Her offer was accepted. Ellison turned to nurse Ethel Gordon Fenwick to help with the task. The two of them created a partnership that was to create to create the French Flag Nursing Corps, coordinating the work of experienced nurses from the British Empire (including Canada, Australia, and New Zealand) with the French Medical Corps during World War I. She gave talks and raised money. She gave talks in Liverpool in 1916 that raised £220. The corps eventually became a program of the French Red Cross. Ellison fell seriously ill in 1917, and spent months recovering at a hospital in Bordeaux. The French government decorated Ellison for her wartime contributions.

After the war, she continued lectures in the United States on behalf of the French Ministry of War, matching French nurses to American nursing schools and expanding their opportunities for training at home. "I am convinced that the most important factor in social reconstruction today is the trained nurse," she explained. "No child welfare work can be done without trained nurses, and the whole future of France depends on what is done for her children." In 1922, she returned to Turkey to cover the Turkish War of Independence; in 1927, she was back in Ankara, reporting on the rapidly changing city.

== Death ==
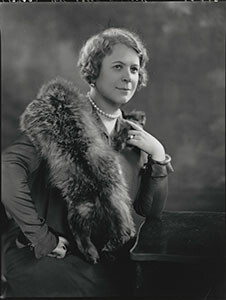
Grace Mary Ellison (1880–1935)

Grace Mary Ellison died in Berlin on 3 October 1935, at the age of 55.

== Monographs by Ellison ==
- A Turkish Woman's European Impressions (1912) with Zeyneb Hanoum
- An Englishwoman in a Turkish Harem (1915)
- An Englishwoman in the French Firing Line (1915)
- An Englishwoman in Occupied Germany (1920)
- An Englishwoman in Angora (1923),
- The Disadvantages of Being a Woman (1924)
- Turkey To-day (1928)
- Yugoslavia: A New Country and its People (1933)

=== Biographies ===
- Abdul Hamid's Daughter, The Tragedy of an Ottoman Princess (1913) with Melek Hanoum
- Memoirs, Prince Nicholas of Greece (1923)
- Biography, Mustafa Kemal Atatürk (1930)
- The Authorised Life Story of Princess Marina (1934)
