= Elizabeth Cameron Mawson =

English flower painter

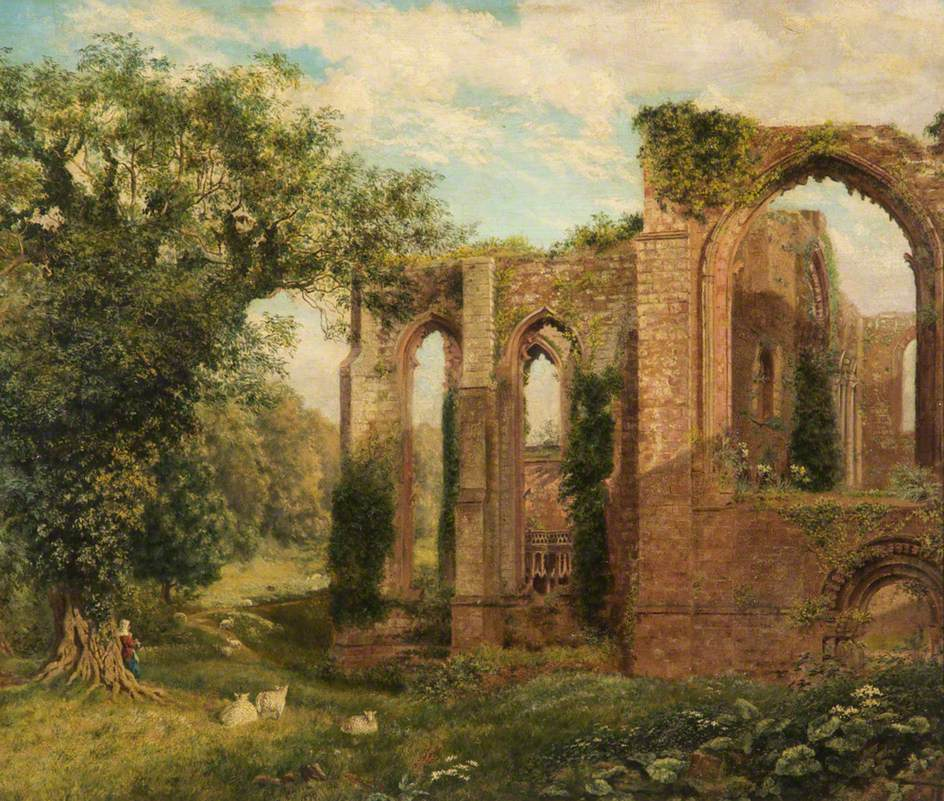
Furness Abbey, Cumbria (1877)

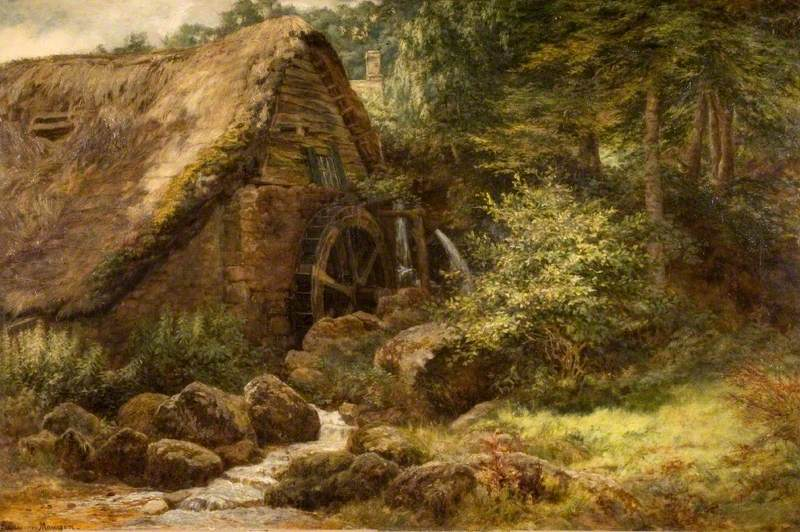
Holy Street Mill (n.d.)

Elizabeth Cameron Mawson (1849–1939) was an English painter.

== Life ==
Elizabeth Cameron Mawson was born in 1849 at Gateshead, the daughter of the businessman John Mawson, who in 1867 was Sheriff of Newcastle, and was killed in the explosion on the Town Moor in the same year.

Elizabeth was educated at Bedford College, London. She later took up art as a hobby, and was effectively self-taught, yet her works commanded reasonable fees.

She spent all her life in Gateshead. She died in Ashfield, Low Fell, Gateshead, unmarried, in early 1939. Her obituary, which appeared in The Newcastle Weekly Chronicle on 14 January, praised her artistic merits and social contribution:

Miss Mawson who was educated at Bedford College, London, at a time when higher education for women was very rare, was an extremely able artist, three of her paintings being hung in the Royal Academy. She was also an energetic social worker, holding official positions in the Gateshead Women's Liberal Association, the British Women's Temperance Association, the Royal Albert Asylum, and a large number of peace societies.

== Works ==
In 1878, some of her work appeared in two local exhibitions, at the Central Exchange Art Gallery and the Arts Association, Newcastle. She produced landscapes, flowers, portraits, and genre studies, in oils and watercolours. By the 1880s she was exhibiting further afield, at the Royal Scottish Academy (1883), the Royal Institute of Painters in Water Colours, the Royal Institute of Oil Painters, the Royal Scottish Society of Painters in Water-Colour, and the Society of Women Artists (1888–90). She also exhibited at the Royal Academy (1889–91) and the Royal Society of British Artists (1877–86). She continued to exhibit locally, occasionally sending works to the Bewick Club, Newcastle.

Her exhibited works included:

- Expectancy,
- An Illustrious Ancestor,
- A Yorkshire Lane,
- Primroses.
