= John F. Kennedy =

President of the United States from 1961 to 1963

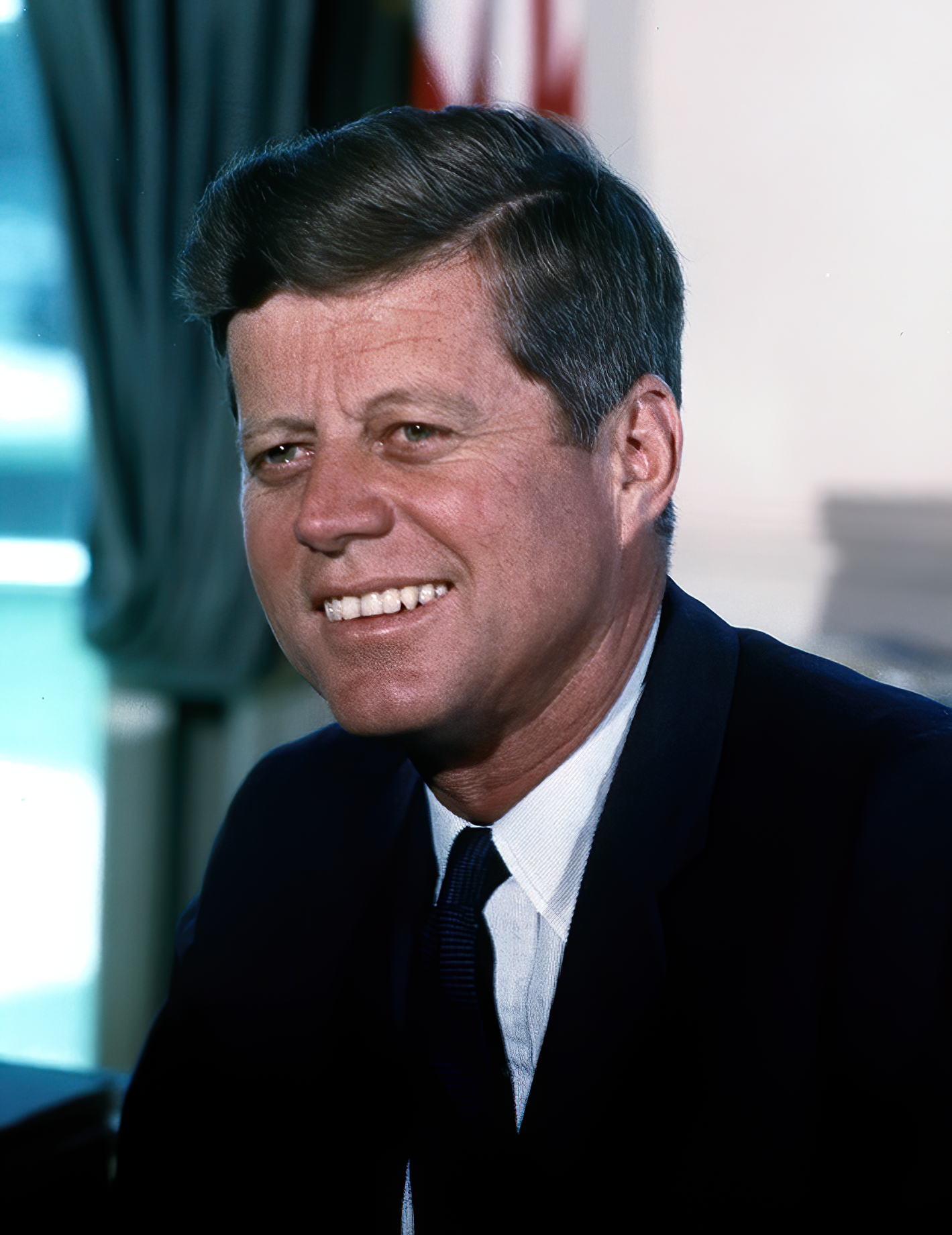
- Oval Office portrait, 1963

35th President of the United States
- In office January 20, 1961 – November 22, 1963
- Vice President: Lyndon B. Johnson
- Preceded by: Dwight D. Eisenhower
- Succeeded by: Lyndon B. Johnson

United States Senator from Massachusetts
- In office January 3, 1953 – December 22, 1960
- Preceded by: Henry Cabot Lodge Jr.
- Succeeded by: Benjamin A. Smith II

Member of the U.S. House of Representatives from Massachusetts's 11th district
- In office January 3, 1947 – January 3, 1953
- Preceded by: James Michael Curley
- Succeeded by: Tip O'Neill

Personal details
- Born: John Fitzgerald Kennedy; May 29, 1917 Brookline, Massachusetts, U.S.
- Died: November 22, 1963 (aged 46) Dallas, Texas, U.S.
- Cause of death: Gunshot wound (assassination) (Note: The autopsy that took place on November 22 determined the cause of death as a gunshot wound to the skull.)
- Resting place: Arlington National Cemetery
- Party: Democratic
- Spouse: Jacqueline Bouvier (m. 1953)
- Children: 4, including Caroline, John Jr., and Patrick
- Parents: Joseph P. Kennedy Sr.; Rose Fitzgerald
- Relatives: Kennedy family
- Education: Harvard University (AB)
- Occupation: Politician; journalist

Military service
- Allegiance: United States
- Branch/service: United States Navy
- Years of service: 1941–1945
- Rank: Lieutenant
- Unit: Motor Torpedo Squadron 2
- Commands: Patrol Torpedo Boat 109; Patrol Torpedo Boat 59
- Battles/wars: World War II; Solomon Islands campaign
- Awards: Navy and Marine Corps Medal; Purple Heart; American Defense Service Medal; American Campaign Medal; Asiatic–Pacific Campaign Medal (with 3 service stars); World War II Victory Medal
- John F. Kennedy's voice Kennedy speaking on the establishment of the Peace Corps; Recorded March 1, 1961

John Fitzgerald Kennedy (May 29, 1917 – November 22, 1963), also known as JFK, was the 35th president of the United States, serving from 1961 until his assassination in 1963. A member of the Democratic Party, he represented Massachusetts in both houses of the U.S. Congress before his presidency. Kennedy was the youngest elected president at 43 years, (Note: Although Theodore Roosevelt was nine months younger when he assumed the presidency, he was not elected until he was 46.) and the first Roman Catholic president.

Born into the prominent Kennedy family in Brookline, Massachusetts, Kennedy graduated from Harvard University in 1940, joining the U.S. Naval Reserve the following year. During World War II, he commanded PT boats in the Pacific theater. Kennedy's survival following the sinking of PT-109 and his rescue of his fellow sailors made him a war hero and earned the Navy and Marine Corps Medal, but left him with serious injuries. After a brief stint in journalism, Kennedy represented a working-class Boston district in the U.S. House of Representatives from 1947 to 1953. He was subsequently elected to the U.S. Senate, serving as the junior senator from Massachusetts from 1953 to 1960. While in the Senate, Kennedy published his book Profiles in Courage, which won a Pulitzer Prize. Kennedy ran in the 1960 presidential election. His campaign gained momentum after the first televised presidential debates in American history, and he was elected president, narrowly defeating Republican opponent Richard Nixon, the incumbent vice president.

Kennedy's presidency saw high tensions with communist states in the Cold War. He increased the number of American military advisers in South Vietnam, and the Strategic Hamlet Program began during his presidency. In 1961, he authorized attempts to overthrow the Cuban government of Fidel Castro in the failed Bay of Pigs Invasion and Operation Mongoose. In October 1962, U.S. spy planes discovered Soviet missile bases had been deployed in Cuba. The resulting period of tensions, termed the Cuban Missile Crisis, nearly resulted in nuclear war. In August 1961, after East German troops erected the Berlin Wall, Kennedy sent an army convoy to reassure West Berliners of U.S. support, and delivered one of his most famous speeches in West Berlin in June 1963. In 1963, Kennedy signed the first nuclear weapons treaty. He presided over the establishment of the Peace Corps, Alliance for Progress with Latin America, and the continuation of the Apollo program with the goal of landing a man on the Moon before 1970. He supported the civil rights movement and saw incomplete success in passing his New Frontier domestic policies.

On November 22, 1963, Kennedy was assassinated in Dallas. His vice president, Lyndon B. Johnson, assumed the presidency. Lee Harvey Oswald was arrested for the assassination, but Jack Ruby shot and killed him two days later. The Federal Bureau of Investigation (FBI) and the Warren Commission both concluded Oswald had acted alone, but conspiracy theories about the assassination persist. After Kennedy's death, Congress enacted many of his proposals, including the Civil Rights Act of 1964 and the Revenue Act of 1964. He ranks highly in polls of U.S. presidents with historians and the general public. His personal life has been the focus of considerable sustained interest following public revelations in the 1970s of his chronic health ailments and extramarital affairs. Kennedy is the most recent U.S. president to have died in office.

== Early life and education ==
John Fitzgerald Kennedy was born on May 29, 1917, outside Boston in Brookline, Massachusetts, to Joseph P. Kennedy Sr., a businessman and politician, and Rose Kennedy (née Fitzgerald), a philanthropist and socialite. His paternal grandfather, P. J. Kennedy, was an East Boston ward boss and Massachusetts state legislator. Kennedy's maternal grandfather and namesake, John F. Fitzgerald, was a U.S. congressman and two-term mayor of Boston. All four of his grandparents were children of Irish immigrants. Kennedy had an older brother, Joseph Jr., and seven younger siblings: Rosemary, Kathleen, Eunice, Patricia, Robert, Jean, and Ted.

Kennedy's father amassed a private fortune and established trust funds for his nine children, guaranteeing them lifelong financial independence. His business kept him away from home for long stretches, but Joe Sr. was a formidable presence in his children's lives. He encouraged them to be ambitious, emphasized political discussions at the dinner table, and demanded a high level of academic achievement. John's first exposure to politics came in 1922, when he toured Boston wards with his grandfather Fitzgerald during his unsuccessful gubernatorial campaign. In September 1927, due to an outbreak of polio in Massachusetts and Joe Sr.'s business interests in Wall Street and Hollywood, the family relocated from Boston to the Riverdale neighborhood of New York City. Several years later, his brother Robert told Look magazine that his father left Boston because of job signs that read: "No Irish Need Apply". The Kennedys spent summers and early autumns at their home in Hyannis Port, Massachusetts, a village on Cape Cod, where they engaged in various outdoor activities. Christmas and Easter holidays were spent at their winter retreat in Palm Beach, Florida. In September 1930, Kennedy, 13 years old, was sent to the Canterbury School in New Milford, Connecticut, for 8th grade. In April 1931, he had an appendectomy, after which he withdrew from Canterbury and recuperated at home.

In September 1931, Kennedy began attending Choate, a preparatory boarding school in Wallingford, Connecticut. Rose had wanted John and Joseph Jr. to attend a Catholic school, but Joseph Sr. believed that if they were to compete in the political world, they needed to be among boys from prominent Protestant families. John spent his first years at Choate in his older brother's shadow and compensated with rebellious behavior that attracted a clique. Their most notorious stunt was exploding a toilet seat with a firecracker. In the next chapel assembly, the headmaster, George St. John, brandished the toilet seat and spoke of "muckers" who would "spit in our sea", leading Kennedy to name his group "The Muckers Club". It included his roommate and lifelong friend Lem Billings. Kennedy graduated from Choate in June 1935, finishing 64th of 112 students. He had been the business manager of the school yearbook and was voted the "most likely to succeed".

Kennedy's birthplace in Brookline, Massachusetts

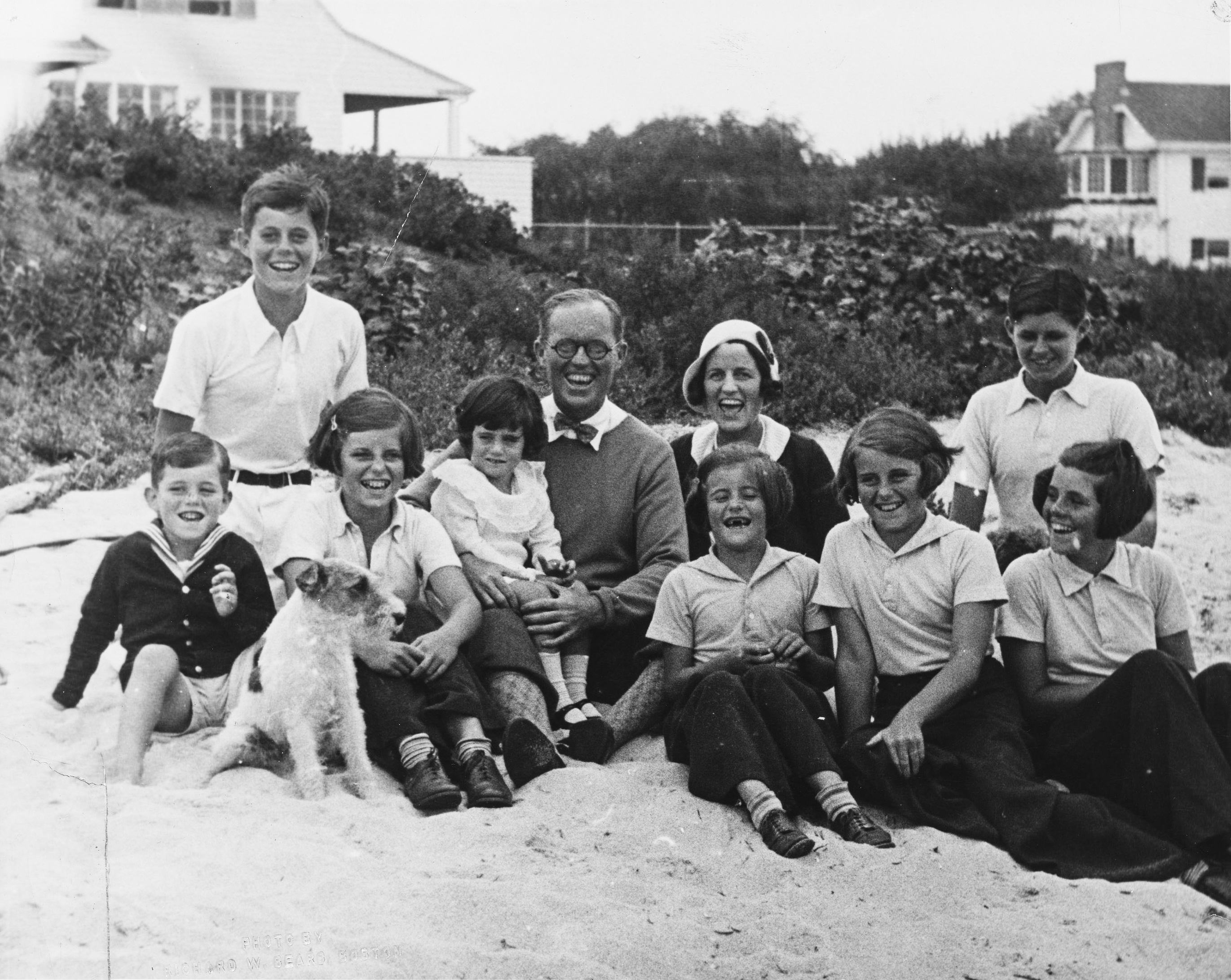
The Kennedy family in Hyannis Port, Massachusetts, with JFK at top left in the white shirt, c. 1931

Kennedy intended to study under Harold Laski at the London School of Economics, as his older brother had done. However, ill health forced his return to the United States in October 1935, when he enrolled late at Princeton University, but had to withdraw after two months due to gastrointestinal illness.

In September 1936, Kennedy enrolled at Harvard College. He wrote occasionally for The Harvard Crimson, the campus newspaper, but had little involvement with campus politics, preferring to concentrate on athletics and his social life. He took up both rugby union and football, playing on the junior varsity squad for the latter during his second year, before an injury forced him off the team, and left him with back problems that plagued him for the rest of his life. He earned membership in the Hasty Pudding Club and the Spee Club, one of Harvard's elite "final clubs".

In July 1938, Kennedy sailed overseas with his older brother to work at the American embassy in London, where their father was serving as President Franklin D. Roosevelt's ambassador to the Court of St. James's. The following year, Kennedy traveled throughout Europe, the Soviet Union, the Balkans, and the Middle East in preparation for his Harvard senior honors thesis. He then went to Berlin, where a U.S. diplomatic representative gave him a secret message about war breaking out soon to pass on to his father, and to Czechoslovakia before returning to London on September 1, 1939—the day that Germany invaded Poland; the start of World War II. Two days later, the family was in the House of Commons for speeches endorsing the United Kingdom's declaration of war on Germany. Kennedy was sent as his father's representative to assist with arrangements for American survivors of the torpedoing of SS Athenia before flying back to the United States on his first transatlantic flight.

While an upperclassman at Harvard, Kennedy began to take his studies more seriously and developed an interest in political philosophy. He made the dean's list in his junior year. In 1940, Kennedy completed his thesis, "Appeasement in Munich", about British negotiations during the Munich Agreement. The thesis was released on July 24, under the title Why England Slept. The book was one of the first to offer information about the war and its origins, and quickly became a bestseller. In addition to addressing Britain's unwillingness to strengthen its military in the lead-up to the war, the book called for an Anglo-American alliance against the rising totalitarian powers. Kennedy became increasingly supportive of U.S. intervention in World War II, and his father's isolationist beliefs resulted in the latter's dismissal as ambassador.

In 1940, Kennedy graduated cum laude from Harvard with a Bachelor of Arts in government, concentrating on international affairs. That fall, he enrolled at the Stanford Graduate School of Business and audited classes, but he left after a semester to help his father complete his memoirs as an American ambassador. In early 1941, Kennedy toured South America.

== U.S. Naval Reserve (1941–1945) ==
Kennedy planned to attend Yale Law School, but canceled those plans when American entry into World War II seemed imminent. In 1940, Kennedy attempted to enter the Army's Officer Candidate School. Despite months of training, he was medically disqualified due to chronic back problems. On September 24, 1941, with the help of Alan Goodrich Kirk—the director of the Office of Naval Intelligence (ONI) and former naval attaché to Joseph Sr.—Kennedy joined the United States Naval Reserve. He was commissioned as an ensign on October 26, 1941, and joined the ONI staff in Washington, D.C.

In January 1942, Kennedy was assigned to the ONI field office at Headquarters, Sixth Naval District, in Charleston, South Carolina. He hoped to command a PT (patrol torpedo) boat, but his health problems seemed almost certain to prevent active duty. Kennedy's father intervened by providing misleading medical records and convincing PT officers that his presence would bring publicity to the fleet. Kennedy completed six months of training at the Naval Reserve Officer Training School in Chicago and at the Motor Torpedo Boat Squadrons Training Center in Melville, Rhode Island. His first command was PT-101 from December 7, 1942, until February 23, 1943. Unhappy with his assignment to the Panama Canal, far from the fighting, Kennedy appealed to Senator David I. Walsh of Massachusetts, who arranged for him to be reassigned to the South Pacific.

=== Commanding PT-109 and PT-59 ===
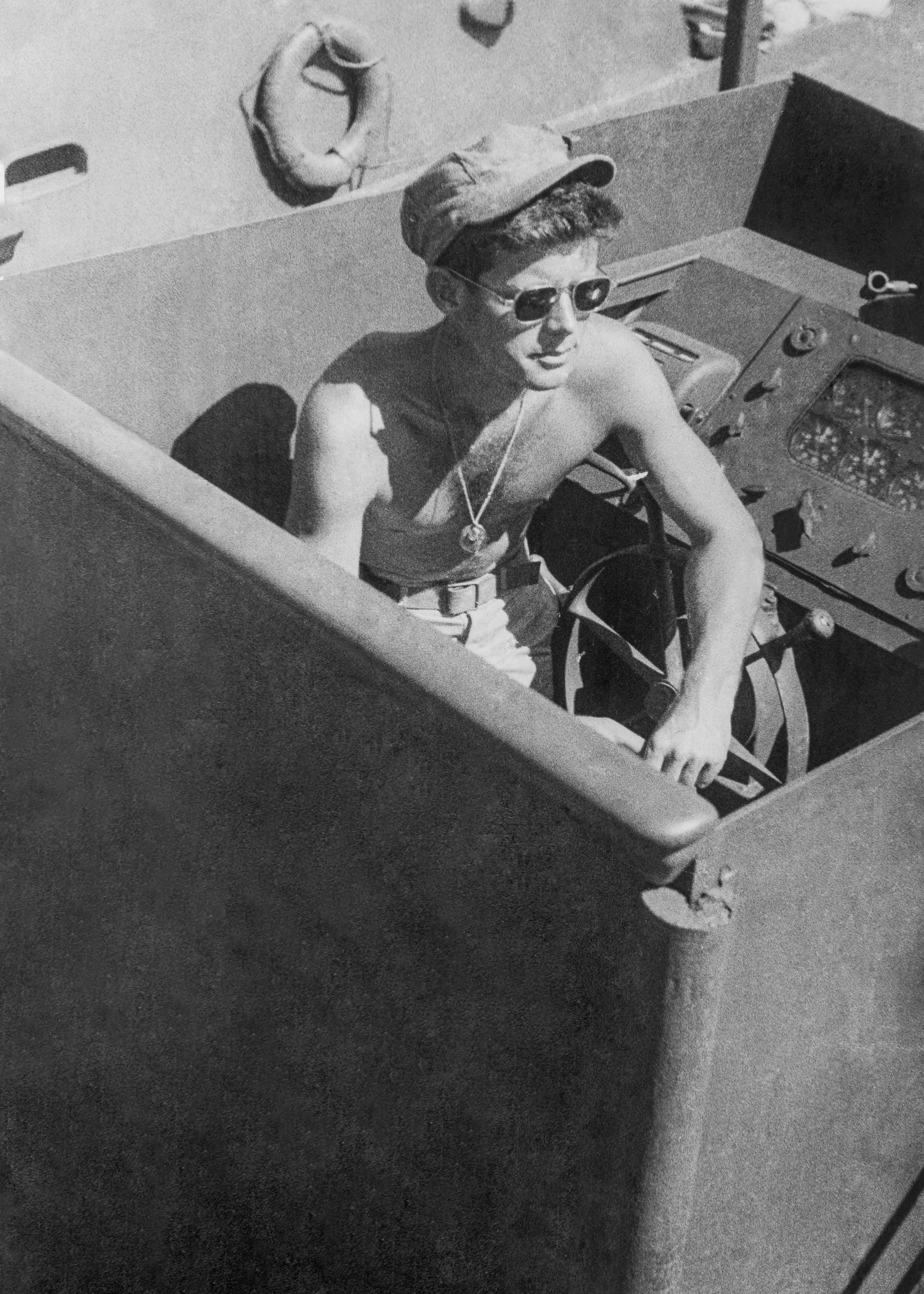
Kennedy on his navy patrol boat, the PT-109, 1943

In April 1943, Kennedy was assigned to Motor Torpedo Squadron TWO, and on April 24 he took command of PT-109, then based on Tulagi Island in the Solomons. On the night of August 1–2, in support of the New Georgia campaign, PT-109 and fourteen other PTs were ordered to block or repel four Japanese destroyers and floatplanes carrying food, supplies, and 900 Japanese soldiers to the Vila Plantation garrison on the southern tip of the Solomon's Kolombangara Island. Intelligence had been sent to Kennedy's commander, Thomas G. Warfield, who, as a result, was expecting the arrival of the large Japanese naval force that would pass on the evening of August 1. Of the 24 torpedoes fired that night by eight of the American PTs, not one hit the Japanese convoy. On that moonless night, Kennedy spotted a Japanese destroyer heading north on its return from the base of Kolombangara around 2:00 am, and attempted to turn to attack, when PT-109 was suddenly rammed at an angle and cut in half by the destroyer Amagiri, killing two PT-109 crew members. (Note: After the war, Kennedy contacted the captain of the Amagiri, Kohei Hanami, and formed a friendship with him. Hanami later supported Kennedy's election campaign.) Avoiding surrender, the remaining crew swam toward Plum Pudding Island, 3.5 miles (5.6 km) southwest of the remains of PT-109, on August 2. Despite re-injuring his back in the collision, Kennedy towed a badly burned crewman named Patrick McMahon to the island with a life jacket strap clenched between his teeth. From there, Kennedy and his subordinate, Ensign George Ross, made forays through the coral islands, searching for help. When they encountered an English-speaking native with a canoe, Kennedy carved his location on a coconut shell and requested a boat rescue. Seven days after the collision, with the coconut message delivered, the PT-109 crew was rescued.

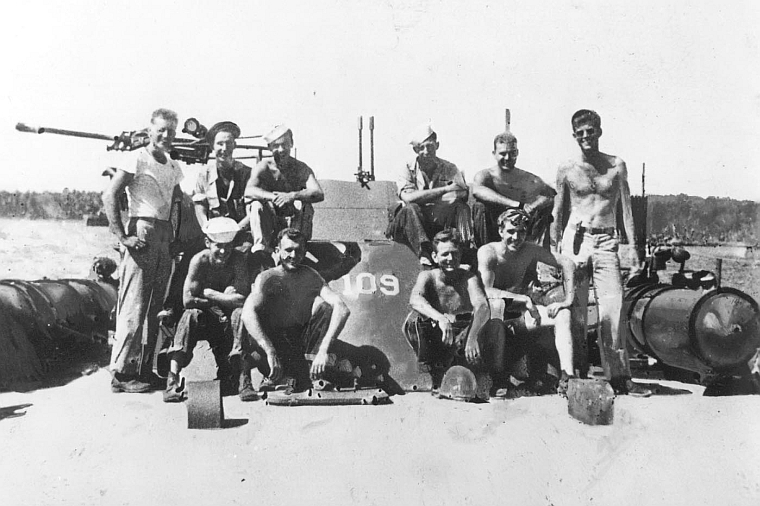
Kennedy (standing, far right) and his crew on the deck of PT 109 in the Solomon Islands, 1943

Almost immediately, the PT-109 rescue became a highly publicized event. The story was chronicled by John Hersey in The New Yorker in 1944; decades later, it was the basis of a successful film. It followed Kennedy into politics and provided a strong foundation for his appeal as a leader. Hersey portrayed Kennedy as a modest, self-deprecating hero. For his courage and leadership, Kennedy was awarded the Navy and Marine Corps Medal, and the injuries he suffered during the incident qualified him for a Purple Heart.

After a month's recovery, Kennedy returned to duty, commanding PT-59. On November 2, Kennedy's PT-59, along with two other PT boats, took part in the rescue of 40 to 50 Marines. The 59 acted as a shield from shore fire as they escaped on two rescue landing craft at the base of the Warrior River on Choiseul Island, taking ten Marines aboard and delivering them to safety. Under doctor's orders, Kennedy was relieved of his command on November 18, and sent to the hospital on Tulagi. By December 1943, with his health deteriorating, Kennedy left the Pacific front and arrived in San Francisco in early January 1944. After receiving treatment for his back injury at the Chelsea Naval Hospital in Massachusetts from May to December 1944, he was released from active duty. Beginning in January 1945, Kennedy spent three months recovering from his back injury at Castle Hot Springs, a resort and temporary military hospital in Arizona. On March 1, 1945, Kennedy retired from the Navy Reserve on physical disability and was honorably discharged with the full rank of lieutenant. When later asked how he became a war hero, Kennedy joked: "It was easy. They cut my PT boat in half."

On August 12, 1944, Kennedy's older brother, Joseph Jr., a Navy pilot, was killed during an air mission. His body was never recovered. News of his death reached the family's home in Hyannis Port, Massachusetts, a day later. Kennedy felt that Joseph Jr.'s reckless flight was partly an effort to outdo him. To console himself, Kennedy set out to assemble a privately published book of remembrances of his brother, As We Remember Joe.

== Journalism (1945) ==
In April 1945, Kennedy's father, who was a friend of William Randolph Hearst, arranged a position for his son as a special correspondent for Hearst Newspapers; the assignment kept Kennedy's name in the public eye and "expose[d] him to journalism as a possible career". He covered the United Nations Conference on International Organization in San Francisco, the British elections, and the Potsdam Conference in Germany.

== U.S. House of Representatives (1947–1953) ==
Kennedy's elder brother, Joe Jr., had been the family's political standard-bearer and was tapped by their father to seek the presidency. After Joe's death, the assignment fell to John as the second eldest. Boston mayor Maurice J. Tobin discussed the possibility of John becoming his running mate in 1946 as a candidate for Massachusetts lieutenant governor, but Joe Sr. preferred a congressional campaign that could send John to Washington, where he could have national visibility.

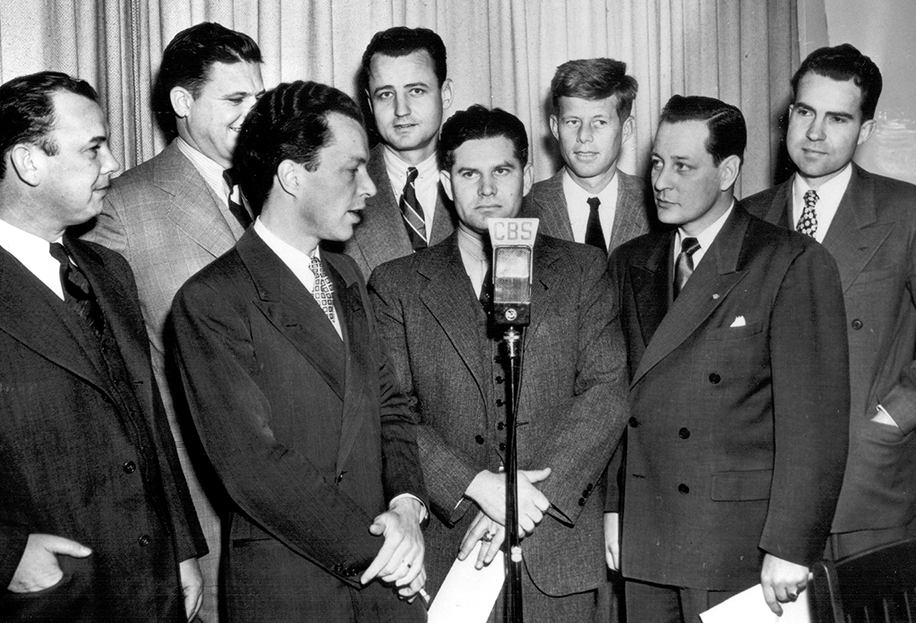
Kennedy (back row, second from right) and Richard Nixon (far right) participate in a radio broadcast as 1947 freshmen House members.

At the urging of Joe Sr., U.S. Representative James Michael Curley vacated his seat in the solidly Democratic 11th congressional district of Massachusetts to become mayor of Boston in 1946. Kennedy established legal residency at 122 Bowdoin Street across from the Massachusetts State House. He won the Democratic primary with 42 percent of the vote, defeating nine other candidates. According to Fredrik Logevall, Joe Sr.

spent hours on the phone with reporters and editors, seeking information, trading confidences, and cajoling them into publishing puff pieces on John, ones that invariably played up his war record in the Pacific. He oversaw a professional advertising campaign that ensured ads went up in just the right places. The campaign had a virtual monopoly on [Boston] subway space, and on window stickers ("Kennedy for Congress") for cars and homes, and was the force behind the mass mailing of Hersey's PT-109 article.

Though Republicans took control of the House in the 1946 elections, Kennedy defeated his Republican opponent in the general election, taking 73 percent of the vote.

As a congressman, Kennedy had a reputation for taking little interest in the management of his office or his constituents' concerns, with one of the highest absenteeism rates in the House, although much was explained by illness. George Smathers, one of his few political friends at the time, claimed that he was more interested in being a writer than a politician, and at that time, he suffered from extreme shyness. Kennedy found "most of his fellow congressmen boring, preoccupied as they all seemed to be with their narrow political concerns". The arcane House rules and customs, which slowed legislation, exasperated him.

Kennedy served in the House for six years, joining the influential Education and Labor Committee and the Veterans' Affairs Committee. He concentrated his attention on international affairs, supporting the Truman Doctrine as an appropriate response to the emerging Cold War. He also supported public housing and opposed the Labor Management Relations Act of 1947, which restricted the power of labor unions. Though not as vocally anti-communist as Joseph McCarthy, Kennedy supported the Internal Security Act of 1950, which required communists to register with the government, and he deplored the "loss of China". Kennedy denounced Truman and the State Department during a speech in Salem, Massachusetts on January 30, 1949, for contributing to the "tragic story of China whose freedom we once fought to preserve. What our young men had saved [in World War II], our diplomats and our President have frittered away." Having served as a Boy Scout during his childhood, Kennedy was active in the Boston Council from 1946 to 1955 as district vice chairman, member of the executive board, vice-president, and National Council Representative.

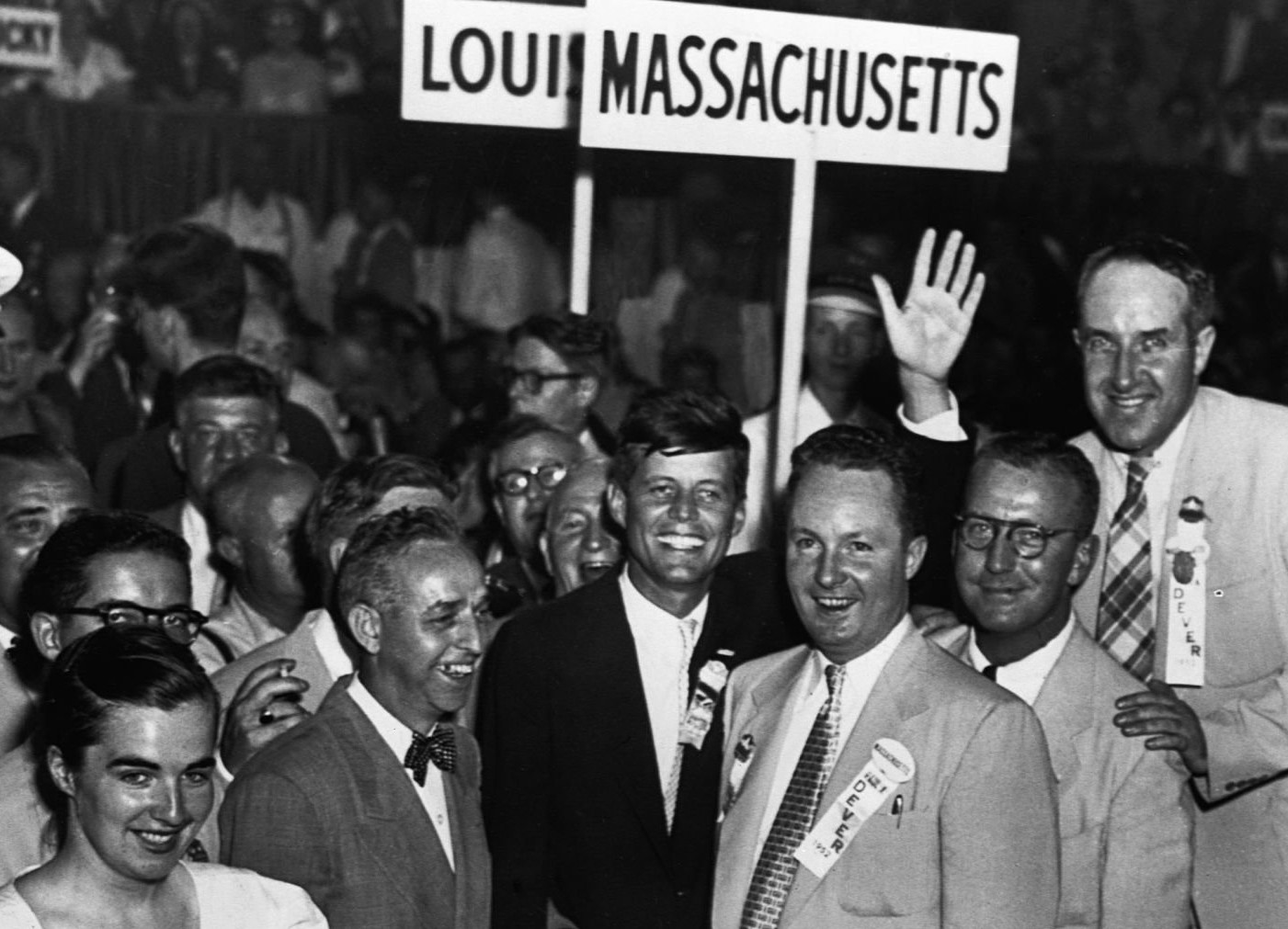
Kennedy (waving) with Massachusetts delegates at the 1952 Democratic National Convention

To appeal to the large Italian-American voting bloc in Massachusetts, Kennedy delivered a speech in November 1947 supporting a $227 million aid package to Italy. He maintained that Italy was in danger from an "onslaught of the communist minority" and that the country was the "initial battleground in the communist drive to capture Western Europe". To counter Soviet efforts to take control in Middle Eastern and Asian countries like Indochina, Kennedy wanted the United States to develop nonmilitary techniques of resistance that would not create suspicions of neoimperialism or add to the country's financial burden. The problem, as he saw it, was not simply to be anti-communist but to stand for something that these emerging nations would find appealing.

Almost every weekend that Congress was in session, Kennedy would fly back to Massachusetts to give speeches to veteran, fraternal, and civic groups, while maintaining an index card file on individuals who might be helpful in a future statewide campaign. Contemplating whether to run for Massachusetts governor or the U.S. Senate, Kennedy abandoned interest in the former, believing that the governor "sat in an office, handing out sewer contracts".

== U.S. Senate (1953–1960) ==
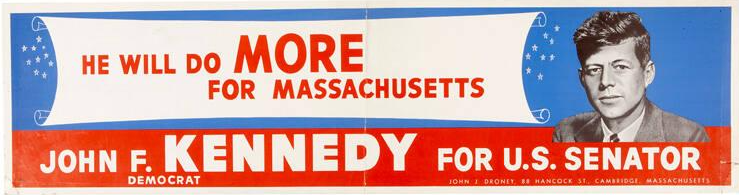
Campaign slogan for Kennedy's 1952 U.S. Senate campaign in Massachusetts

As early as 1949, Kennedy began preparing to run for the Senate in 1952 against Republican three-term incumbent Henry Cabot Lodge Jr. with the campaign slogan "KENNEDY WILL DO MORE FOR MASSACHUSETTS". Joe Sr. again financed his son's candidacy—persuading the Boston Post to switch its support to Kennedy by promising the publisher a $500,000 loan—while John's younger brother Robert emerged as campaign manager. Kennedy's mother and sisters were also highly effective canvassers, hosting a series of "teas" at hotels and parlors across Massachusetts to reach out to women voters. In the presidential election, Republican Dwight D. Eisenhower carried Massachusetts by 208,000 votes, but Kennedy narrowly defeated Lodge by 70,000 votes for the Senate seat. The following year, he married Jacqueline Bouvier.

Kennedy underwent several spinal operations over the next two years. Often absent from the Senate, he was at times critically ill and received Catholic last rites. During his convalescence in 1956, he published Profiles in Courage, a book about U.S. senators who risked their careers for their personal beliefs, for which he won the Pulitzer Prize for Biography in 1957. Rumors that this work was ghostwritten by his close adviser and speechwriter, Ted Sorensen, were confirmed in Sorensen's 2008 autobiography.

At the start of his first term, Kennedy focused on fulfilling the promise of his campaign to do "more for Massachusetts" than his predecessor. Although Kennedy's and Lodge's legislative records were similarly liberal, Lodge voted for the Taft-Hartley Act of 1947 and Kennedy voted against it. On NBC's Meet the Press, Kennedy excoriated Lodge for not doing enough to prevent the increasing migration of manufacturing jobs from Massachusetts to the South, and blamed the right-to-work provision for giving the South an unfair advantage over Massachusetts in labor costs. In May 1953, Kennedy introduced "The Economic Problems of New England", a 36-point program to help Massachusetts industries such as fishing, textile manufacturing, watchmaking, and shipbuilding, as well as the Boston seaport. Kennedy's policy agenda included protective tariffs, preventing excessive speculation in raw wool, stronger efforts to research and market American fish products, an increase in the Fish and Wildlife Service budget (including funds for US FWS Albatross III), funds to rehabilitate the South Boston Army Base, shipbuilding contracts at the Fore River Shipyard in Quincy, Massachusetts, and the development of hydroelectric and nuclear power in New England—such as the Yankee Rowe Nuclear Power Station in Rowe, Massachusetts, which began construction in 1958. Kennedy's suggestions for stimulating the region's economy appealed to both parties by offering benefits to business and labor, and promising to serve national defense. Congress would eventually enact most of the program. A Massachusetts Audubon Society supporter, Kennedy wanted to make sure that the shorelines of Cape Cod remained unsullied by industrialization. On September 3, 1959, Kennedy co-sponsored the Cape Cod National Seashore bill with his Republican colleague Senator Leverett Saltonstall.

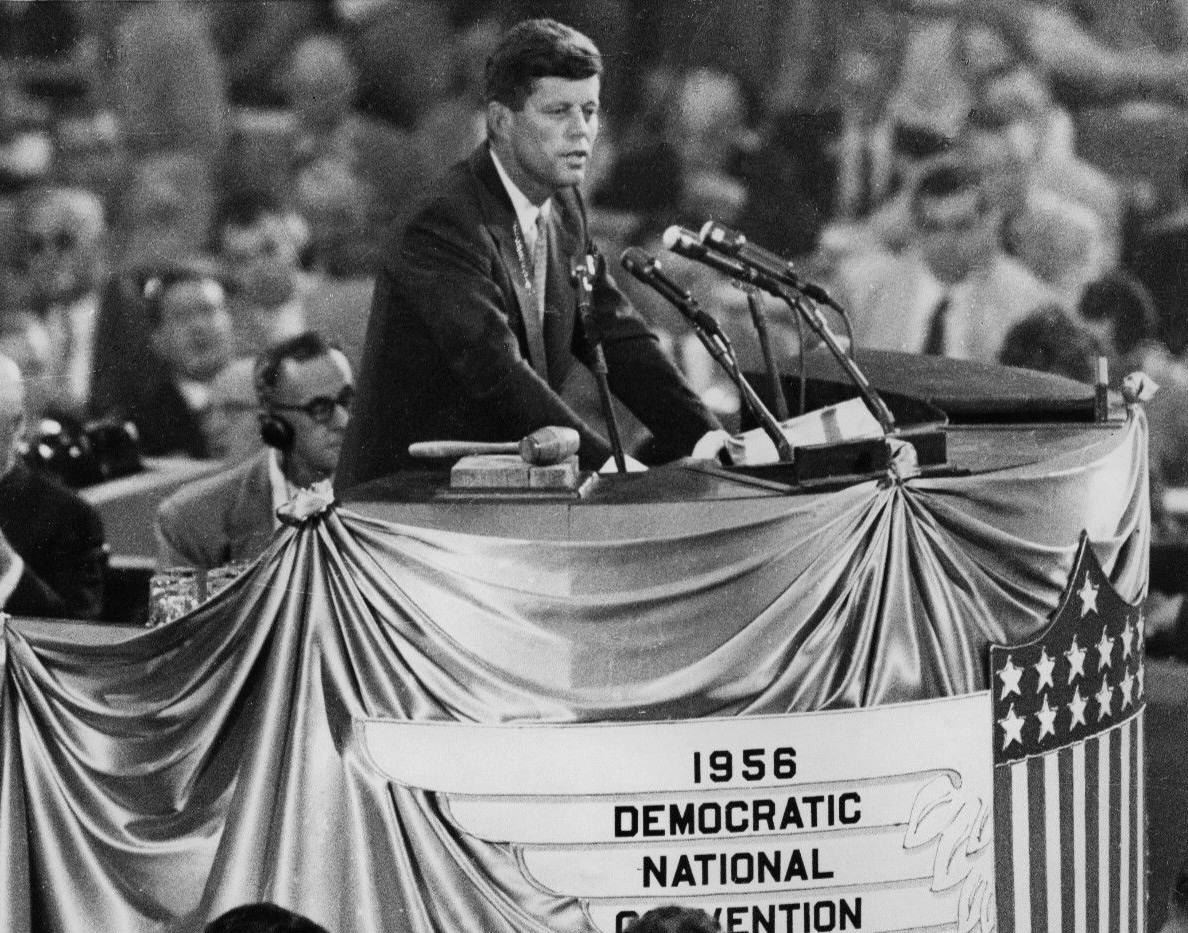
Kennedy endorsing Adlai Stevenson II for the presidential nomination at the 1956 Democratic National Convention

As a senator, Kennedy quickly won a reputation for responsiveness to requests from constituents (i.e., co-sponsoring legislation to provide federal loans to help rebuild communities damaged by the 1953 Worcester tornado), except on certain occasions when the national interest was at stake. In 1954, Kennedy voted in favor of the Saint Lawrence Seaway which would connect the Great Lakes to the Atlantic Ocean, despite opposition from Massachusetts politicians who argued that the project would hurt the Port of Boston economically.

In 1954, when the Senate voted to condemn Joseph McCarthy for breaking Senate rules and abusing an Army general, Kennedy was the only Democrat not to cast a vote against him. Kennedy drafted a speech supporting the censure. However, it was not delivered because Kennedy was hospitalized for back surgery in Boston. Although Kennedy never indicated how he would have voted, the episode damaged his support among members of the liberal community in the 1956 and 1960 elections.

In 1956, Kennedy gained control of the Massachusetts Democratic Party, and delivered the state delegation to the party's presidential nominee, Adlai Stevenson II, at the Democratic National Convention in August. Stevenson let the convention select the vice presidential nominee. Kennedy finished second in the balloting, losing to Senator Estes Kefauver of Tennessee, but receiving national exposure.

In 1957, Kennedy joined the Senate's Select Committee on Labor Rackets (also known as the McClellan Committee) with his brother Robert, who was chief counsel, to investigate racketeering in labor-management relations. The hearings attracted extensive radio and television coverage where the Kennedy brothers engaged in dramatic arguments with controversial labor leaders, including Jimmy Hoffa of the Teamsters Union. The following year, Kennedy introduced a bill to prevent the expenditure of union dues for improper purposes or private gain; to forbid loans from union funds for illicit transactions; and to compel audits of unions, which would ensure against false financial reports. It was the first major labor relations bill to pass either house since the Taft–Hartley Act of 1947 and dealt largely with the control of union abuses exposed by the McClellan Committee, but did not incorporate tough Taft–Hartley amendments requested by President Eisenhower. It survived Senate floor attempts to include Taft-Hartley amendments and passed but was rejected by the House. "Honest union members and the general public can only regard it as a tragedy that politics has prevented the recommendations of the McClellan committee from being carried out this year", Kennedy announced.

That same year, Kennedy joined the Senate's Foreign Relations Committee. There he supported Algeria's effort to gain independence from France and sponsored an amendment to the Mutual Defense Assistance Act that would provide aid to Soviet satellite nations. Kennedy in 1959 introduced a controversial bill to eliminate from the National Defense Education Act of 1958 a provision requiring loyalty oaths and affidavits from aid recipients.

Kennedy cast a procedural vote against President Eisenhower's bill for the Civil Rights Act of 1957, and this was considered by some to be an appeasement of Southern Democratic opponents of the bill. Kennedy did vote for Title III of the act, which would have given the Attorney General powers to enjoin, but Majority Leader Lyndon B. Johnson agreed to let the provision die as a compromise measure. Kennedy also voted for the "Jury Trial Amendment". Many civil rights advocates criticized the vote as one that would weaken the Act. A final compromise bill, which Kennedy supported, was passed in September 1957. As a senator from Massachusetts, which lacked a sizable Black population, Kennedy was not particularly sensitive to the problems of African Americans. Robert Kennedy later reflected, "We weren't thinking of the Negroes of Mississippi or Alabama—what should be done for them. We were thinking of what needed to be done in Massachusetts."

Results of the 1958 U.S. Senate election in Massachusetts by municipality. Kennedy's margin of victory of 874,608 votes was the largest in Massachusetts political history. Kennedy: 40–50% 50–60% 60–70% 70–80% 80–90% >90%; Celeste: 40–50% 50–60% 60–70% 70–80%

Most historians and political scientists who have written about Kennedy refer to his U.S. Senate years as an interlude. According to historian Robert Dallek, Kennedy called being a senator "the most corrupting job in the world". He complained that they were all too quick to cut deals and please campaign contributors to ensure their political futures. Kennedy, with the luxury of a rich father who could finance his campaigns, could remain independent of any special interest, except for those in his home state of Massachusetts that could align against his reelection. According to author Robert Caro, Majority Leader Lyndon Johnson viewed Kennedy as a "playboy", describing his performance in the Senate and the House as "pathetic" on another occasion, saying that he was "smart enough, but he doesn't like the grunt work". Author John T. Shaw acknowledges that while his Senate career is not associated with acts of "historic statesmanship" or "novel political thought", Kennedy made modest contributions as a legislator, drafting more than 300 bills to benefit Massachusetts and the New England region, some of which became law.

In 1958, Kennedy was re-elected to the Senate, defeating his Republican opponent, Boston lawyer Vincent J. Celeste, with 73.6 percent of the vote, the largest winning margin in the history of Massachusetts politics. In the aftermath of his re-election, Kennedy began preparing to run for president by traveling throughout the U.S. to build his candidacy for 1960.

== 1960 presidential election ==
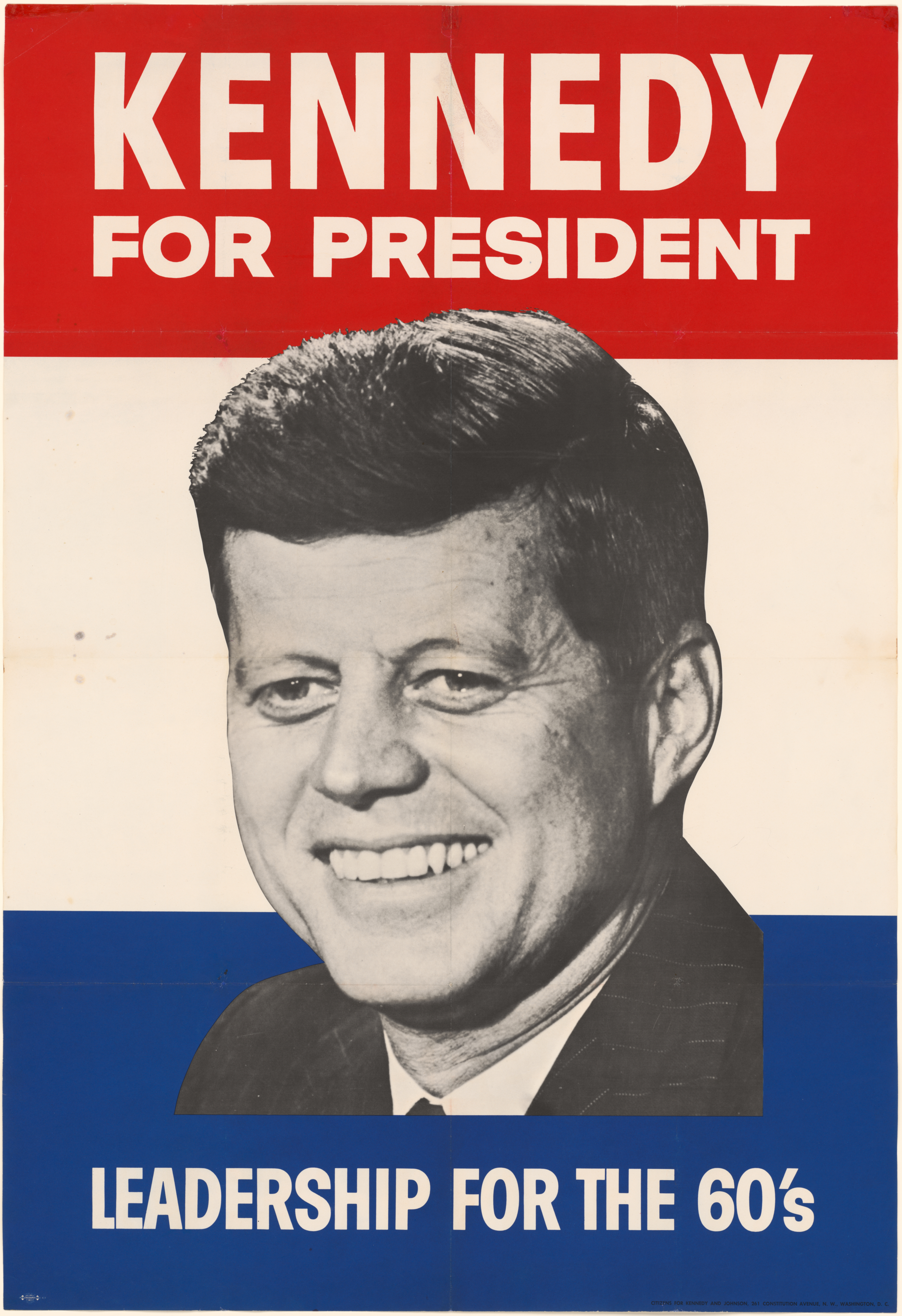
1960 presidential campaign poster

On January 2, 1960, Kennedy announced his candidacy for the Democratic presidential nomination. Though some questioned Kennedy's age and experience, his charisma and eloquence earned him numerous supporters. Kennedy faced several potential challengers, including Senate Majority Leader Lyndon Johnson, Adlai Stevenson II, and Senator Hubert Humphrey.

Kennedy traveled extensively to build his support. His campaign strategy was to win several primaries to demonstrate his electability to the party bosses, who controlled most of the delegates, and to prove to his detractors that a Catholic could win popular support. Victories over Senator Humphrey in the Wisconsin and West Virginia primaries gave Kennedy momentum as he moved on to the 1960 Democratic National Convention in Los Angeles.

When Kennedy entered the convention, he had the most delegates, but not enough to ensure that he would win the nomination. Stevenson—the 1952 and 1956 presidential nominee—remained very popular, while Johnson also hoped to win the nomination with support from party leaders. Kennedy's candidacy also faced opposition from former President Harry S. Truman, who was concerned about Kennedy's lack of experience. Kennedy knew that a second ballot could give the nomination to Johnson or someone else, and his well-organized campaign was able to earn the support of just enough delegates to win the presidential nomination on the first ballot.

Kennedy ignored the opposition of his brother Robert, who wanted him to choose labor leader Walter Reuther, and other liberal supporters when he chose Johnson as his vice-presidential nominee. He believed that the Texas senator could help him win support from the South. In accepting the presidential nomination, Kennedy gave his well-known "New Frontier" speech:

For the problems are not all solved and the battles are not all won—and we stand today on the edge of a New Frontier. ... But the New Frontier of which I speak is not a set of promises—it is a set of challenges. It sums up not what I intend to offer the American people, but what I intend to ask of them.

At the start of the fall general election campaign, the Republican nominee and incumbent Vice President Richard Nixon held a six-point lead in the polls. Major issues included how to get the economy moving again, Kennedy's Catholicism, the Cuban Revolution, and whether the space and missile programs of the Soviet Union had surpassed those of the U.S. To address fears that his Catholic faith would impact his decision-making, he told the Greater Houston Ministerial Association on September 12: "I am not the Catholic candidate for president. I am the Democratic Party candidate for president who also happens to be a Catholic. I do not speak for my Church on public matters—and the Church does not speak for me." He promised to respect the separation of church and state, and not to allow Catholic officials to dictate public policy.

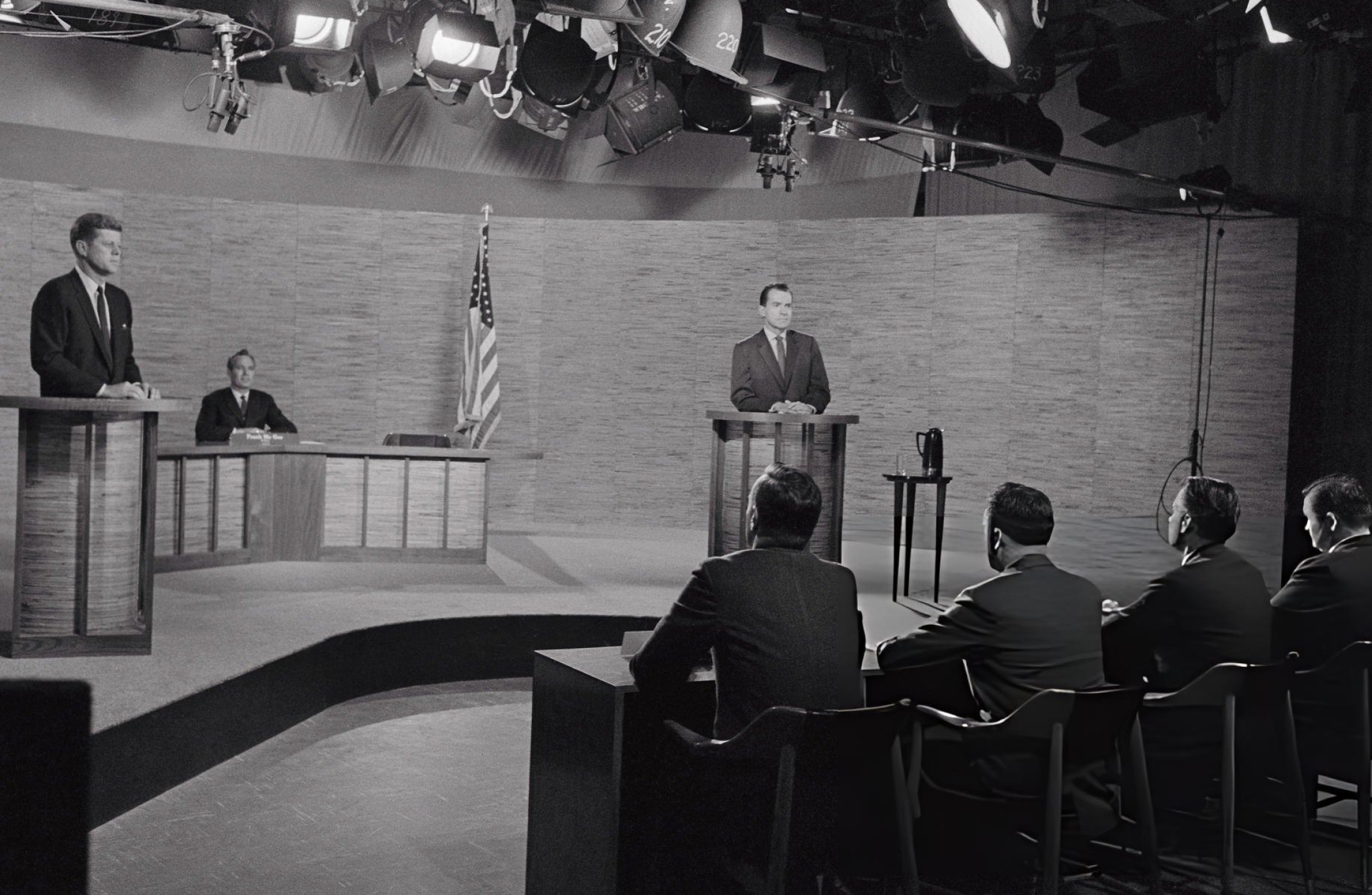
Kennedy and Richard Nixon participate in the nation's second televised presidential debate, c. October 7, 1960

The Kennedy and Nixon campaigns agreed to a series of televised debates. An estimated 70 million Americans, about two-thirds of the electorate, watched the first debate on September 26. Kennedy had met the day before with the producer to discuss the set design and camera placement. Nixon, recently released from the hospital after a painful knee injury, did not take advantage of this opportunity and, during the debate, looked at the reporters asking questions and not at the camera. Kennedy wore a blue suit and shirt to reduce glare and appeared sharply focused against the gray studio background. Nixon wore a light-colored suit that blended into the gray background; in combination with the harsh studio lighting that left Nixon perspiring, he offered a less-than-commanding presence. By contrast, Kennedy appeared relaxed, tanned, and telegenic, looking into the camera while answering questions. It is often claimed that television viewers overwhelmingly believed Kennedy, appearing to be the more attractive of the two, had won, while radio listeners (a smaller audience) thought Nixon had defeated him. However, only one poll split TV and radio voters like this and the methodology was poor. Pollster Elmo Roper concluded that the debates raised interest, boosted turnout, and gave Kennedy an estimated two million additional votes, largely due to the first debate. The debates are now considered a milestone in American political history—the point at which the medium of television began to play a dominant role.

Results of the 1960 presidential election; the popular vote split between Kennedy and Republican Richard Nixon was less than one percentage point.

Kennedy's campaign gained momentum after the first debate, and he pulled slightly ahead of Nixon in most polls. On Election Day, Kennedy defeated Nixon in one of the closest presidential elections of the 20th century. In the national popular vote, by most accounts, Kennedy led Nixon by just two-tenths of one percent (49.7% to 49.5%), while in the Electoral College, he won 303 votes to Nixon's 219 (269 were needed to win). Fourteen electors from Mississippi and Alabama refused to support Kennedy because he supported the civil rights movement; they voted for Senator Harry F. Byrd of Virginia, as did an elector from Oklahoma. Forty-three years old, Kennedy was the youngest person ever elected to the presidency (though Theodore Roosevelt was a year younger when he succeeded to the presidency after the assassination of William McKinley in 1901).

== Presidency (1961–1963) ==
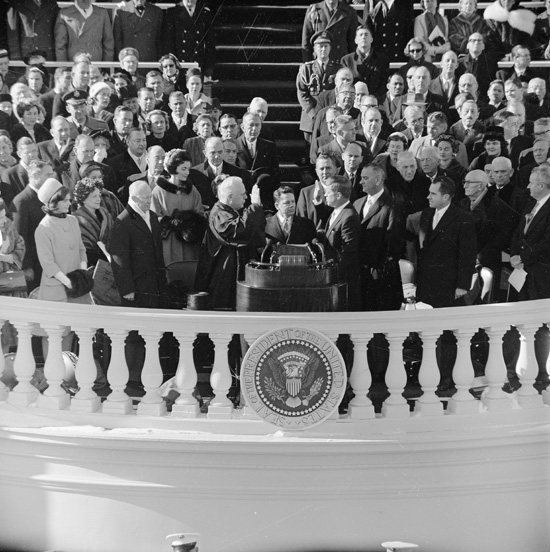
Chief Justice Earl Warren administers the presidential oath of office to Kennedy at the Capitol, January 20, 1961

Kennedy was sworn in as the 35th president at noon on January 20, 1961. In his inaugural address, he spoke of the need for all Americans to be active citizens: "Ask not what your country can do for you—ask what you can do for your country." He asked the nations of the world to join to fight what he called the "common enemies of man: tyranny, poverty, disease, and war itself." He added:

"All this will not be finished in the first one hundred days. Nor will it be finished in the first one thousand days, nor in the life of this Administration, nor even perhaps in our lifetime on this planet. But let us begin." In closing, he expanded on his desire for greater internationalism: "Finally, whether you are citizens of America or citizens of the world, ask of us here the same high standards of strength and sacrifice which we ask of you."

The address reflected Kennedy's confidence that his administration would chart a historically significant course in both domestic policy and foreign affairs. The contrast between this optimistic vision and the pressures of managing daily political realities would be one of the main tensions of the early years of his administration.

Kennedy scrapped the decision-making structure of Eisenhower, favoring an organizational model resembling a wheel, with all spokes leading to the president. He was willing to make the increased number of rapid decisions required in such an environment. Though the cabinet remained important, Kennedy generally relied more on his staffers within the Executive Office. Despite concerns over nepotism, Kennedy's father insisted that Robert Kennedy become U.S. Attorney General, and the younger Kennedy became the "assistant president" who advised on all major issues.

=== Foreign policy ===
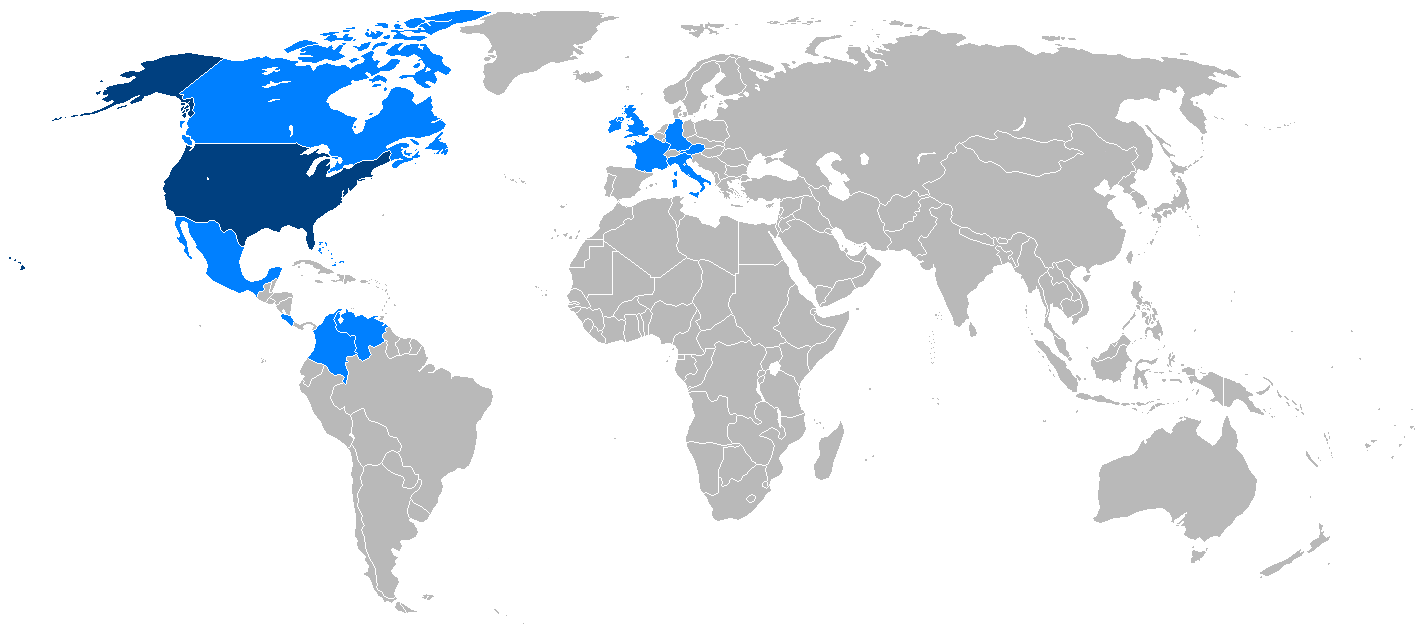
Foreign trips of Kennedy during his presidency

==== Cold War and flexible response ====
Kennedy's foreign policy was dominated by American confrontations with the Soviet Union, manifested by proxy contests in the global state of tension known as the Cold War. Like his predecessors, Kennedy adopted the policy of containment to stop the spread of communism. Fearful of the possibility of nuclear war, Kennedy implemented a defense strategy known as flexible response. This strategy relied on multiple options for responding to the Soviet Union, discouraged massive retaliation, and encouraged mutual deterrence. In contrast to Eisenhower's warning about the perils of the military-industrial complex, Kennedy focused on rearmament. From 1961 to 1964 the number of nuclear weapons increased by 50 percent, as did the number of B-52 bombers to deliver them.

In January 1961, Soviet Premier Nikita Khrushchev declared his support for wars of national liberation. Kennedy interpreted this step as a direct threat to the "free world".

==== Decolonization and the Congo Crisis ====
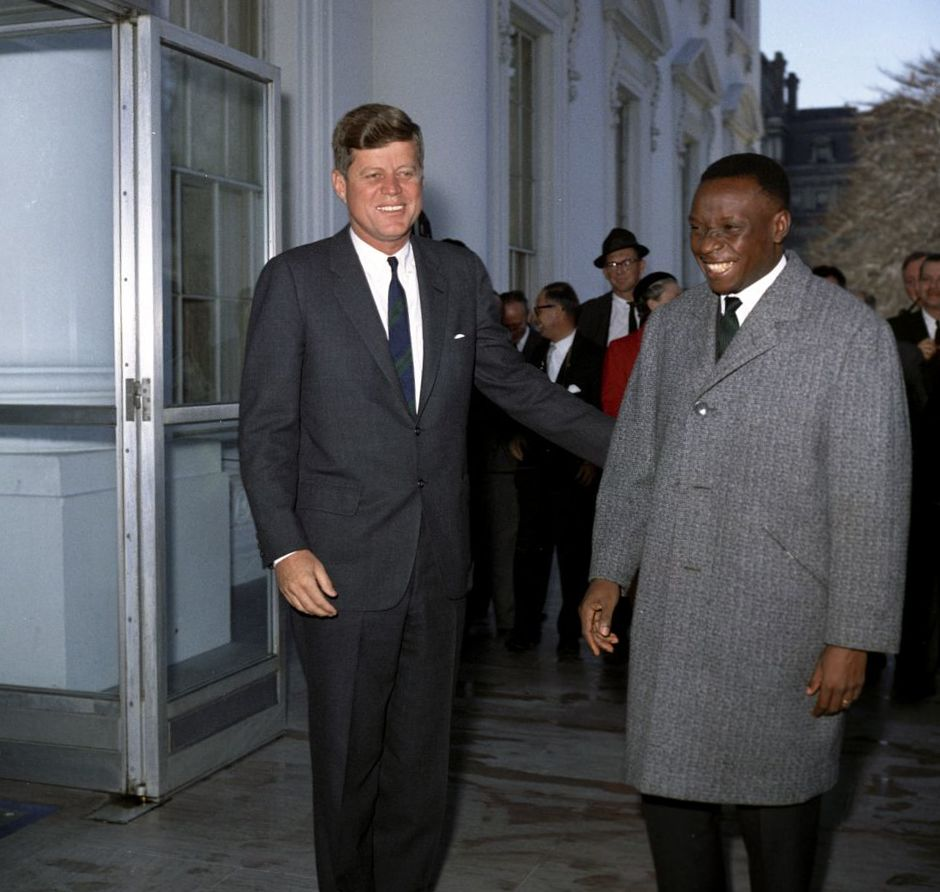
President Kennedy with Congolese Prime Minister Cyrille Adoula in 1962

Between 1960 and 1963, twenty-four countries gained independence as the process of decolonization continued. Kennedy set out to woo the leaders and people of the "Third World", expanding economic aid and appointing knowledgeable ambassadors. His administration established the Food for Peace program and the Peace Corps to provide aid to developing countries. The Food for Peace program became a central element in American foreign policy, and eventually helped many countries to develop their economies and become commercial import customers.

During the election campaign, Kennedy attacked the Eisenhower administration for losing ground on the African continent, and stressed that the U.S. should be on the side of anti-colonialism and self-determination. Kennedy considered the Congo Crisis to be among the most important foreign policy issues facing his presidency, and he supported a UN operation that prevented the secession of Katanga. Moïse Tshombe, leader of Katanga, declared its independence from the Congo, and the Soviet Union responded by sending weapons and technicians to underwrite their struggle. On October 2, 1962, Kennedy signed the United Nations bond issue bill to ensure U.S. assistance in financing UN peacekeeping operations in the Congo and elsewhere.

==== Peace Corps ====
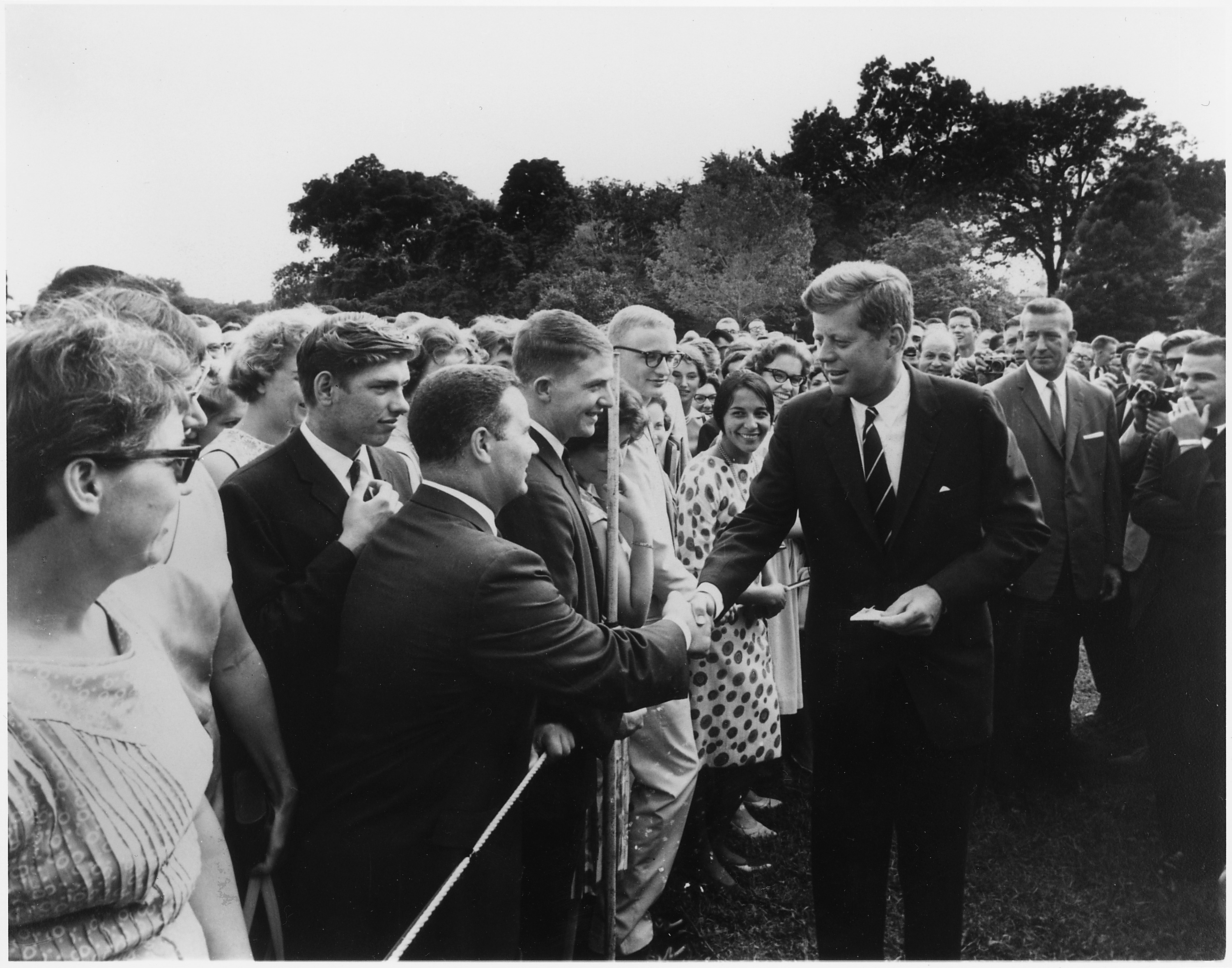
Kennedy greets Peace Corps volunteers on August 28, 1961

In one of his first presidential acts, Kennedy signed Executive Order 10924 that officially started the Peace Corps. He named his brother-in-law, Sargent Shriver, as its first director. Through this program, Americans volunteered to help developing countries in fields like education, farming, health care, and construction. Kennedy believed that countries that received Peace Corps volunteers were less likely to succumb to a communist revolution. Tanganyika (present-day Tanzania) and Ghana were the first countries to participate. The organization grew to 5,000 members by March 1963 and 10,000 the year after. Since 1961, over 200,000 Americans have joined the Peace Corps, representing 139 countries.

==== Vienna Summit and the Berlin Wall ====
Kennedy anxiously anticipated a summit with Nikita Khrushchev. The proceedings for the summit got off to a problematic start when Kennedy reacted aggressively to a routine Khrushchev speech on Cold War confrontation in early 1961. The speech was intended for domestic audiences in the Soviet Union, but Kennedy interpreted it as a personal challenge. His mistake helped raise tensions going into the Vienna summit. The summit would cover several topics, but both leaders knew that the most contentious issue would be Berlin, which had been divided in two with the start of the Cold War. The enclave of West Berlin lay within Soviet-allied East Germany, but was supported by the U.S. and other Western powers. The Soviets wanted to reunify Berlin under the control of East Germany, partly due to the large number of East Germans who had fled to West Berlin.

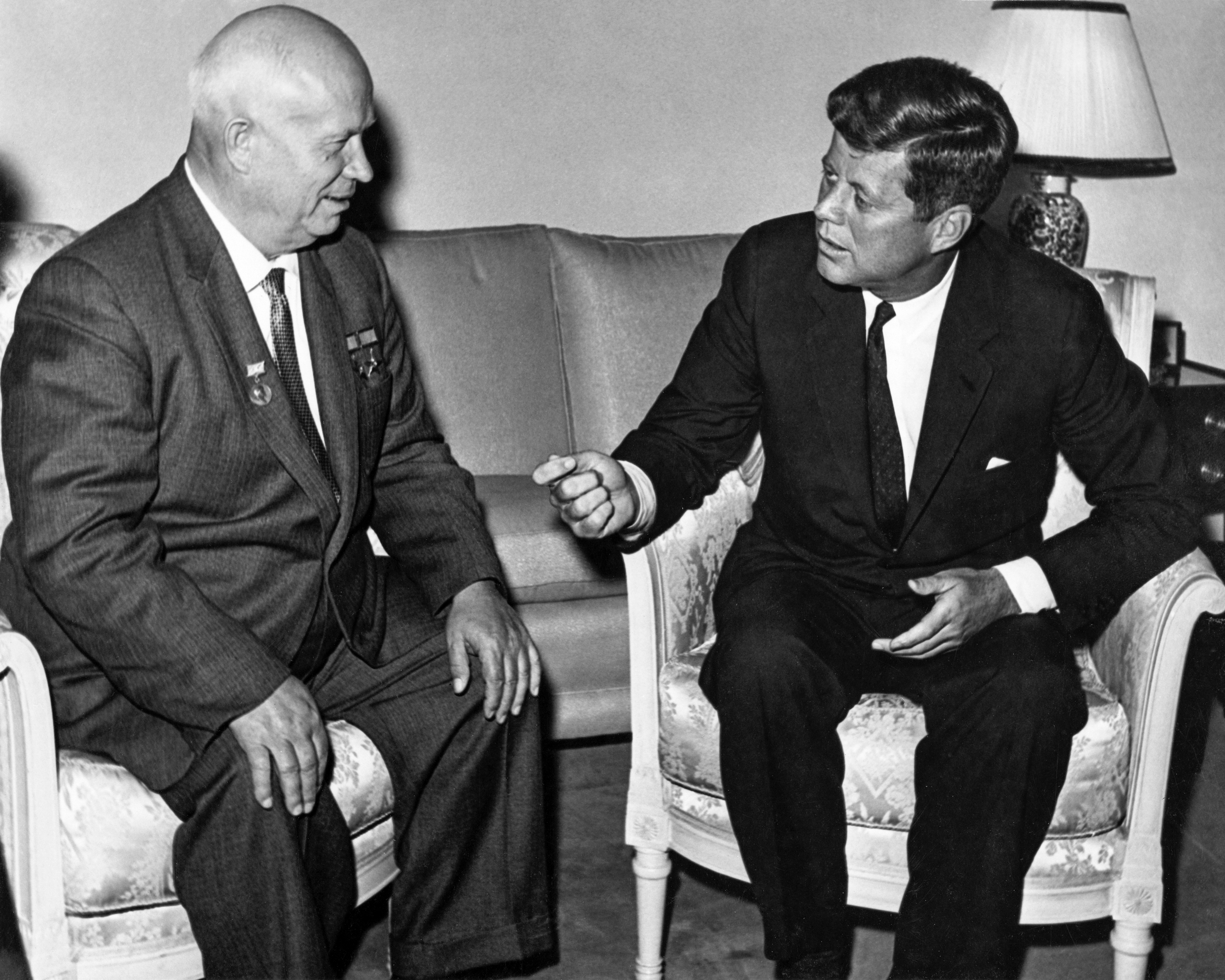
Kennedy meeting with Soviet Premier Nikita Khrushchev in Vienna in June 1961

On June 4, 1961, Kennedy met with Khrushchev in Vienna and left the meeting angry and disappointed that he had allowed the premier to bully him, despite the warnings he had received. Khrushchev, for his part, was impressed with the president's intelligence but thought him weak. Kennedy did succeed in conveying the bottom line to Khrushchev on the most sensitive issue before them, a proposed treaty between Moscow and East Berlin. He made it clear that any treaty interfering with U.S. access rights in West Berlin would be regarded as an act of war. Shortly after Kennedy returned home, the Soviet Union announced its plan to sign a treaty with East Berlin, abrogating any third-party occupation rights in either sector of the city. Kennedy assumed that his only option was to prepare the country for nuclear war, which he thought had a one-in-five chance of occurring.

In the weeks immediately following the summit, more than 20,000 people fled from East Berlin to the western sector, reacting to statements from the Soviet Union. Kennedy began intensive meetings on the Berlin issue, where Dean Acheson took the lead in recommending a military buildup alongside NATO allies. In a July 1961 speech, Kennedy announced his decision to add $3.25 billion (equivalent to $35.02 billion in 2025) to the defense budget, along with over 200,000 additional troops, stating that an attack on West Berlin would be taken as an attack on the U.S. The speech received an 85% approval rating.

A month later, both the Soviet Union and East Berlin began blocking any further passage of East Germans into West Berlin and erected barbed-wire fences, which were quickly upgraded to the Berlin Wall. Kennedy acquiesced to the wall, though he sent Vice President Johnson to West Berlin to reaffirm U.S. commitment to the enclave's defense. In the following months, in a sign of rising Cold War tensions, both the U.S. and the Soviet Union ended a moratorium on nuclear weapon testing. A brief stand-off between U.S. and Soviet tanks occurred at Checkpoint Charlie in October following a dispute over free movement of Allied personnel. The crisis was defused largely through a backchannel communication the Kennedy administration had set up with Soviet spy Georgi Bolshakov. In remarks to his aides on the Berlin Wall, Kennedy noted that "it's not a very nice solution, but a wall is a hell of a lot better than a war."

==== Bay of Pigs Invasion ====
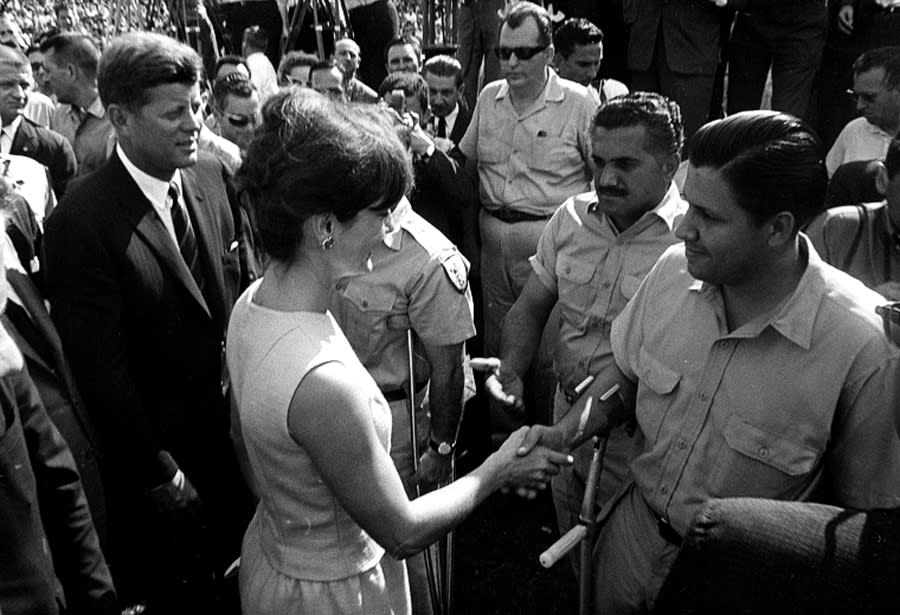
President Kennedy and Jacqueline Kennedy greet members of the 2506 Cuban Invasion Brigade at Miami's Orange Bowl; c. December 29, 1962

The Eisenhower administration had created a plan to overthrow Fidel Castro's regime though an invasion of Cuba by a counter-revolutionary insurgency composed of U.S.-trained, anti-Castro Cuban exiles led by CIA paramilitary officers. Kennedy had campaigned on a hardline stance against Castro, and when presented with the plan that had been developed under the Eisenhower administration, he enthusiastically adopted it regardless of the risk of inflaming tensions with the Soviet Union. Kennedy approved the final invasion plan on April 4, 1961.

On April 15, 1961, eight CIA-supplied B-26 bombers left Nicaragua to bomb Cuban airfields. The bombers missed many of their targets, leaving most of Castro's air force intact. On April 17, the 1,500 U.S.-trained Cuban exile invasion force, known as Brigade 2506, landed at beaches along the Bay of Pigs and immediately came under heavy fire. The goal was to spark a widespread popular uprising against Castro, but no such uprising occurred. No U.S. air support was provided. The invading force was defeated within two days by the Cuban Revolutionary Armed Forces; 114 were killed and Kennedy was forced to negotiate for the release of the 1,189 survivors. After twenty months, Cuba released the captured exiles in exchange for a ransom of $53 million worth of food and medicine. The incident made Castro wary of the U.S. and led him to believe that another invasion would take place.

Biographer Richard Reeves said that Kennedy focused primarily on the political repercussions of the plan rather than military considerations. When it proved unsuccessful, he was convinced that the plan was a setup to make him look bad. He took responsibility for the failure, saying, "We got a big kick in the leg and we deserved it. But maybe we'll learn something from it." Kennedy's approval ratings climbed afterwards, helped in part by the vocal support given to him by Nixon and Eisenhower. He appointed Robert Kennedy to help lead a committee to examine the causes of the failure. The Kennedy administration banned all Cuban imports and convinced the Organization of American States (OAS) to expel Cuba.

==== Operation Mongoose ====
In late 1961, the White House formed the Special Group (Augmented), headed by Robert Kennedy and including Edward Lansdale, Secretary Robert McNamara, and others. The group's objective—to overthrow Castro via espionage, sabotage, and other covert tactics—was never pursued. In November 1961, he authorized Operation Mongoose. In March 1962, Kennedy rejected Operation Northwoods, proposals for false flag attacks against American military and civilian targets, and blaming them on the Cuban government to gain approval for a war against Cuba. However, the administration continued to plan for an invasion of Cuba in the summer of 1962.

==== Cuban Missile Crisis ====
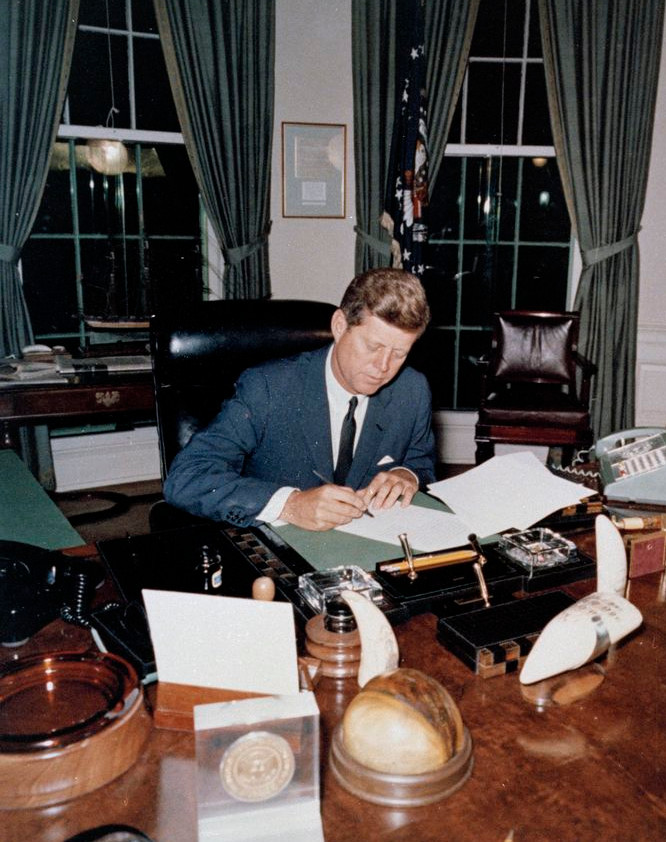
Kennedy signs the Proclamation for Interdiction of the Delivery of Offensive Weapons to Cuba in the Oval Office; c. October 23, 1962

In the aftermath of the Bay of Pigs invasion, Khrushchev increased economic and military assistance to Cuba. The Soviet Union planned to allocate in Cuba 49 medium-range ballistic missiles, 32 intermediate-range ballistic missiles, 49 light Il-28 bombers and about 100 tactical nuclear weapons. The Kennedy administration viewed the growing Cuba-Soviet alliance with alarm, fearing that it could eventually pose a threat to the U.S. On October 14, 1962, CIA U-2 spy planes took photographs of the Soviets' construction of intermediate-range ballistic missile sites in Cuba. The photos were shown to Kennedy on October 16; a consensus was reached that the missiles were offensive in nature and posed an immediate nuclear threat.

Kennedy faced a dilemma: if the U.S. attacked the sites, it might lead to nuclear war with the Soviet Union, but if the U.S. did nothing, it would be faced with the increased threat from close-range nuclear weapons (positioned approximately 90 mi (140 km) away from the Florida coast). The U.S. would also appear to the world as less committed to the defense of the Western Hemisphere. On a personal level, Kennedy needed to show resolve in reaction to Khrushchev, especially after the Vienna summit. To deal with the crisis, he formed an ad-hoc body of key advisers, later known as EXCOMM, that met secretly between October 16 and 28.

More than a third of U.S. National Security Council (NSC) members favored an unannounced air assault on the missile sites, but some saw this as "Pearl Harbor in reverse". There was some concern from the international community (asked in confidence) that the assault plan was an overreaction, given that Eisenhower had placed PGM-19 Jupiter missiles in Italy and Turkey in 1958. It also could not be assured that the assault would be 100% effective. In concurrence with a majority vote of the NSC, Kennedy decided on a naval blockade (or "quarantine"). On October 22, after privately informing the cabinet and leading members of Congress about the situation, Kennedy announced the naval blockade on national television and warned that U.S. forces would seize "offensive weapons and associated materiel" that Soviet vessels might attempt to deliver to Cuba.

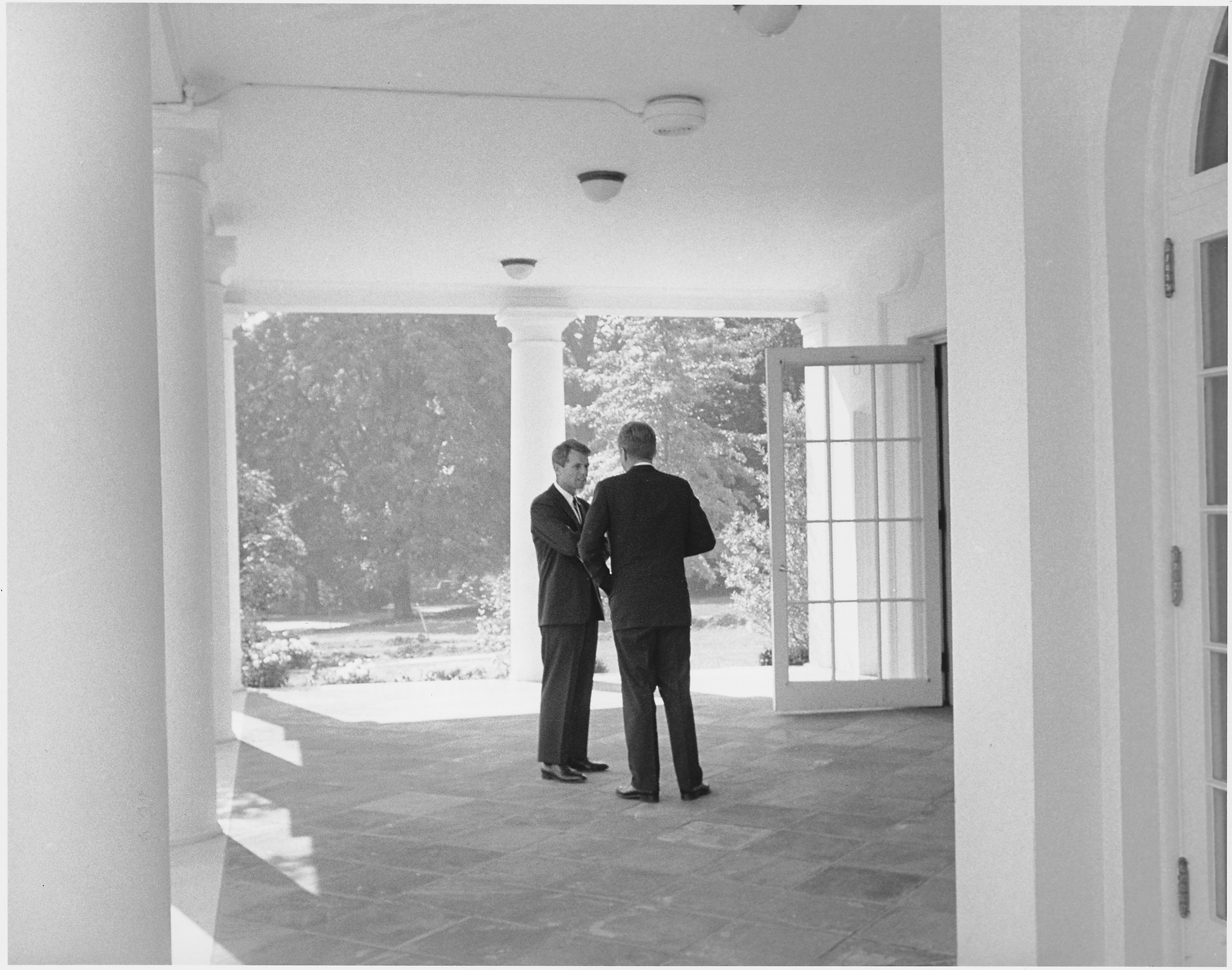
Kennedy confers with Attorney General Robert Kennedy; c. October 1962

The U.S. Navy would stop and inspect all Soviet ships arriving off Cuba, beginning October 24. Several Soviet ships approached the blockade line, but they stopped or reversed course. The OAS gave unanimous support to the removal of the missiles. Kennedy exchanged two sets of letters with Khrushchev, to no avail. UN Secretary General U Thant requested both parties to reverse their decisions and enter a cooling-off period. Khrushchev agreed, but Kennedy did not. Kennedy managed to preserve restraint when a Soviet missile unauthorizedly downed a U.S. Lockheed U-2 reconnaissance aircraft over Cuba, killing pilot Rudolf Anderson.

At the president's direction, Robert Kennedy privately informed Soviet Ambassador Anatoly Dobrynin that the U.S. would remove the Jupiter missiles from Turkey "within a short time after this crisis was over". On October 28, Khrushchev agreed to dismantle the missile sites, subject to UN inspections. The U.S. publicly promised never to invade Cuba and privately agreed to remove its Jupiter missiles from Italy and Turkey, which were by then obsolete and had been supplanted by submarines equipped with UGM-27 Polaris missiles.

In the aftermath, a Moscow–Washington hotline was established to ensure clear communications between the leaders of the two countries. This crisis brought the world closer to nuclear war than at any point before or after, but "the humanity" of Khrushchev and Kennedy prevailed. The crisis improved the image of American willpower and the president's credibility. Kennedy's approval rating increased from 66% to 77% immediately thereafter.

==== Latin America and communism ====
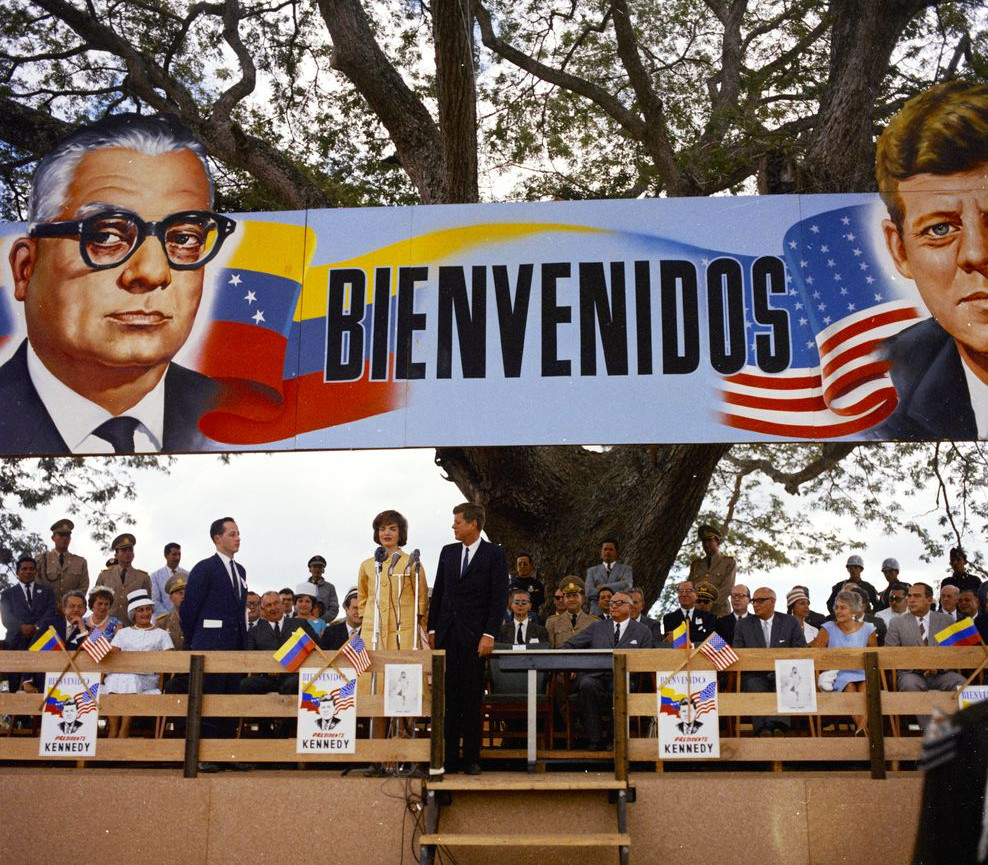
Kennedy in December 1961 promoting the Alliance for Progress with Venezuelan President Rómulo Betancourt

Believing that "those who make peaceful revolution impossible, will make violent revolution inevitable", Kennedy sought to contain the perceived threat of communism in Latin America by establishing the Alliance for Progress, which sent aid to some countries and sought greater human rights standards in the region. In response to Kennedy's plea, Congress voted for an initial grant of $500 million in May 1961. The Alliance for Progress supported the construction of housing, schools, airports, hospitals, clinics and water-purification projects as well as the distribution of free textbooks to students. However, the program did not meet many of its goals. Massive land reform was not achieved; populations more than kept pace with gains in health and welfare; and according to one study, only 2 percent of economic growth in 1960s Latin America directly benefited the poor. U.S. presidents after Kennedy were less supportive of the program and by 1973, the permanent committee established to implement the Alliance was disbanded by the OAS.

The Eisenhower administration, through the CIA, had begun formulating plans to assassinate Castro in Cuba and Rafael Trujillo in the Dominican Republic. When Kennedy took office, he privately instructed the CIA that any plan must include plausible deniability by the U.S. His public position was in opposition. In June 1961, the Dominican Republic's leader was assassinated; in the days following, Undersecretary of State Chester Bowles led a cautious reaction by the nation. Robert Kennedy, who saw an opportunity for the U.S., called Bowles "a gutless bastard" to his face.

==== Laos ====
After the election, Eisenhower emphasized to Kennedy that the communist threat in Southeast Asia required priority; Eisenhower considered Laos to be "the cork in the bottle" in regards to the regional threat. In March 1961, Kennedy voiced a change in policy from supporting a "free" Laos to a "neutral" Laos, indicating privately that Vietnam should be deemed America's tripwire for communism's spread in the area. Though he was unwilling to commit U.S. forces to a major military intervention in Laos, Kennedy did approve CIA activities designed to defeat Communist insurgents through bombing raids and the recruitment of the Hmong people.

==== Vietnam ====
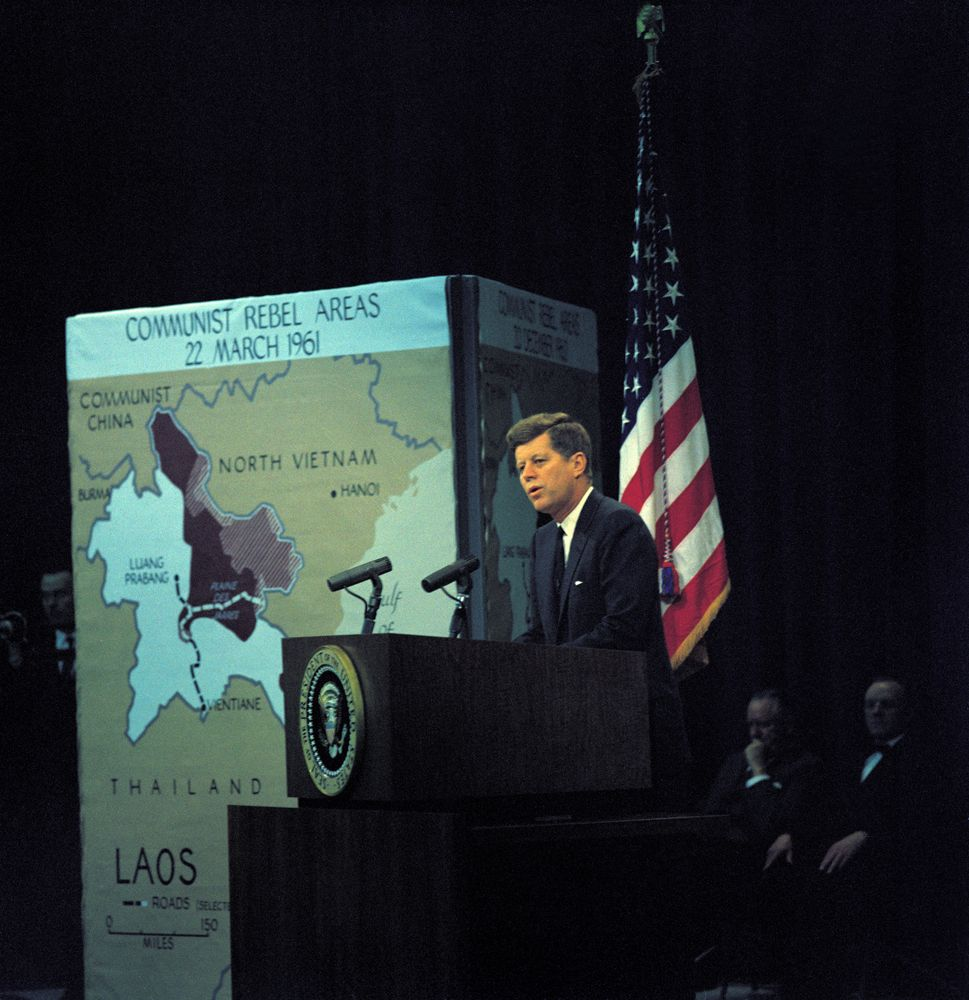
Kennedy speaking in a televised press conference on the situation in Southeast Asia, c. March 23, 1961

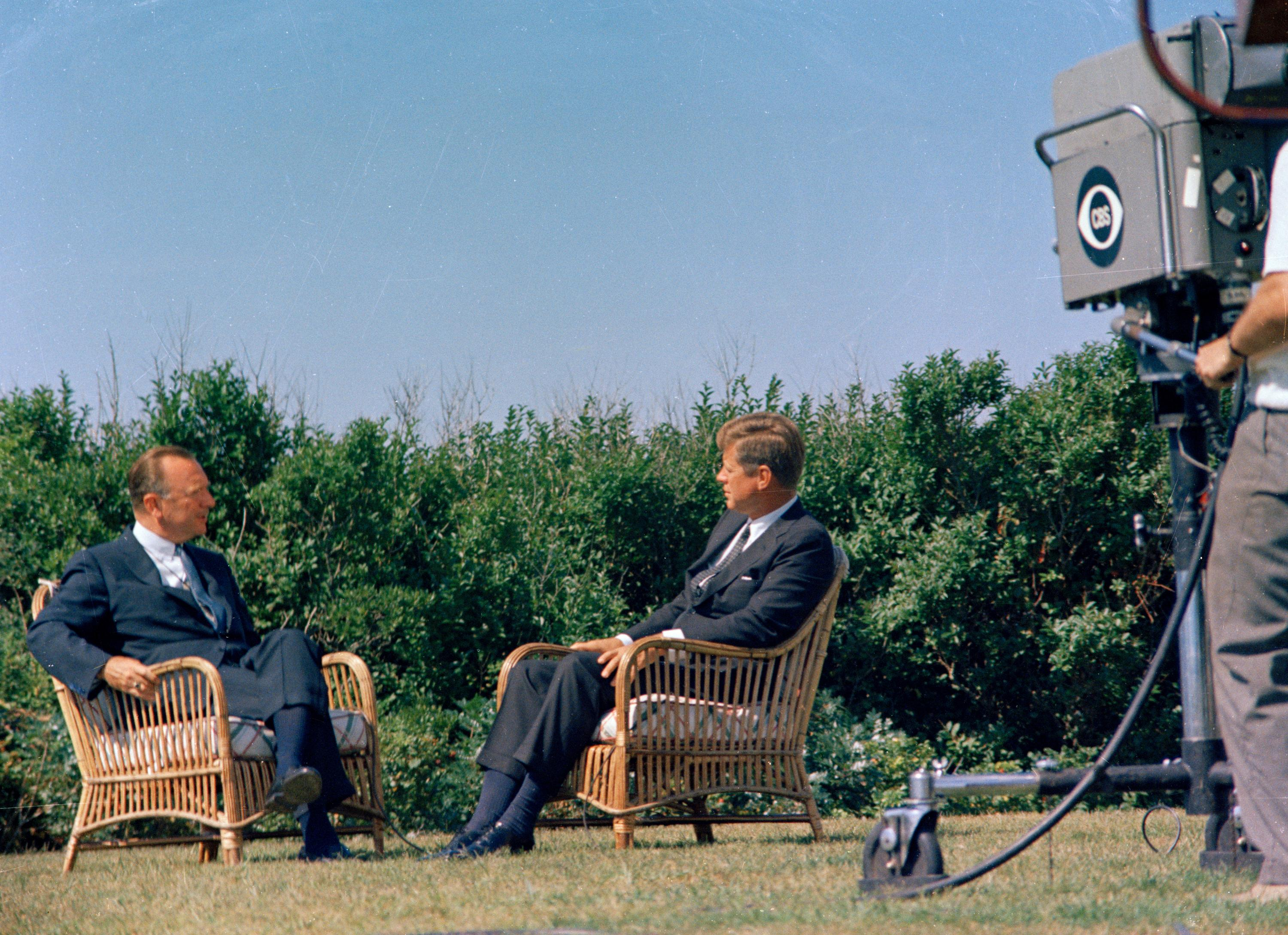
Walter Cronkite of CBS News interviewing Kennedy in Cape Cod, Massachusetts on September 2, 1963, about U.S. involvement in Vietnam

During his presidency, Kennedy continued policies that provided political, economic, and military support to the South Vietnamese government. Vietnam had been divided into a communist North Vietnam and a non-communist South Vietnam after the 1954 Geneva Conference, but Kennedy escalated American involvement in Vietnam in 1961 by financing the South Vietnam army, increasing the number of U.S. military advisors above the levels of the Eisenhower administration, and authorizing U.S. helicopter units to provide support to South Vietnamese forces. On January 18, 1962, Kennedy formally authorized escalated involvement when he signed the National Security Action Memorandum (NSAM) – "Subversive Insurgency (War of Liberation)". Operation Ranch Hand, a large-scale aerial defoliation effort using the herbicide Agent Orange, began on the roadsides of South Vietnam to combat guerrilla defendants.

Though Kennedy provided support for South Vietnam throughout his tenure, Vietnam remained a secondary issue for the Kennedy administration until 1963. On September 2, Kennedy declared in an interview with Walter Cronkite of CBS:

In the final analysis, it is their war. They are the ones who have to win it or lose it. We can help them, we can give them equipment, we can send our men out there as advisers, but they have to win it, the people of Vietnam, against the Communists... But I don't agree with those who say we should withdraw. That would be a great mistake... [The United States] made this effort to defend Europe. Now Europe is quite secure. We also have to participate—we may not like it—in the defense of Asia.

Kennedy increasingly soured on the president of South Vietnam, Ngo Dinh Diem, whose violent crackdown on Buddhist practices galvanized opposition to his leadership. In August 1963, Henry Cabot Lodge Jr. replaced Frederick Nolting as the U.S. ambassador to South Vietnam. Days after his arrival in South Vietnam, Lodge reported that several South Vietnamese generals sought the assent of the U.S. government to their plan of removing Diem from power. The Kennedy administration was split regarding not just the removal of Diem, but also their assessment of the military situation and the proper U.S. role in the country. After the State Department sent a diplomatic cable to Lodge that ordered him to pressure Diem to remove military authority from his brother, Ngô Đình Nhu, or face potential withdrawal of U.S. support and removal from power, Kennedy instructed Lodge to offer covert assistance to a coup d'état, excluding assassination. On November 1, 1963, a junta of senior military officers executed the coup which led to the arrest and assassinations of Diem and Nhu on November 2.

By November 1963, there were 16,000 American military personnel in South Vietnam, up from Eisenhower's 900 advisors; more than one hundred Americans had been killed in action and no final policy decision was made. In the aftermath of the aborted coup in September 1963, the Kennedy administration reevaluated its policies in South Vietnam. Kennedy rejected the full-scale deployment of ground soldiers but also the total withdrawal of U.S. forces. Historians disagree on whether the U.S. military presence in Vietnam would have escalated had Kennedy survived and been re-elected in 1964. Fueling the debate are statements made by Secretary of Defense McNamara in the 2003 documentary film The Fog of War that Kennedy was strongly considering pulling out of Vietnam after the 1964 election, and comments made by Kennedy administration White House Counsel and speechwriter Ted Sorensen in a 2008 memoir suggesting that Kennedy was undecided about what policy direction to take.

On October 11, 1963, Kennedy signed NSAM 263 ordering the withdrawal of 1,000 military personnel by the end of the year following the third recommendation of the McNamara–Taylor mission report, which concluded that the training program for the South Vietnamese military had sufficiently progressed to justify the withdrawal. However, NSAM 263 also approved the first recommendation of the report to continue providing support to South Vietnam to prevent the spread of communism and until the Viet Cong was suppressed, while the third recommendation suggested that even if the majority of the U.S. military objective was completed by the end of 1965 that continued presence of U.S. training personnel in more limited numbers could be necessary if the insurgency was not suppressed.

==== West Berlin speech ====
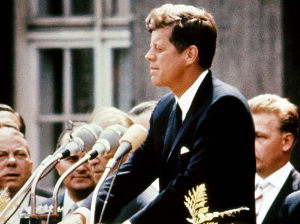
Kennedy delivering his speech in West Berlin

In 1963, Germany was enduring a time of particular vulnerability due to Soviet aggression to the east as well as the impending retirement of West German Chancellor Adenauer. At the same time, French President Charles de Gaulle was trying to build a Franco-West German counterweight to the American and Soviet spheres of influence. To Kennedy's eyes, this Franco-German cooperation seemed directed against NATO's influence in Europe.

To reinforce the U.S. alliance with West Germany, Kennedy traveled to West Germany and West Berlin in June 1963. On June 26, Kennedy toured West Berlin, culminating in a public speech at the city hall in front of hundreds of thousands of enthusiastic Berliners. He reiterated the American commitment to Germany and criticized communism, and was met with an ecstatic response from the massive audience. Kennedy used the construction of the Berlin Wall as an example of the failures of communism: "Freedom has many difficulties, and democracy is not perfect. But we have never had to put a wall up to keep our people in, to prevent them from leaving us." The speech is known for its famous phrase "Ich bin ein Berliner" ("I am a Berliner").

==== Middle East ====
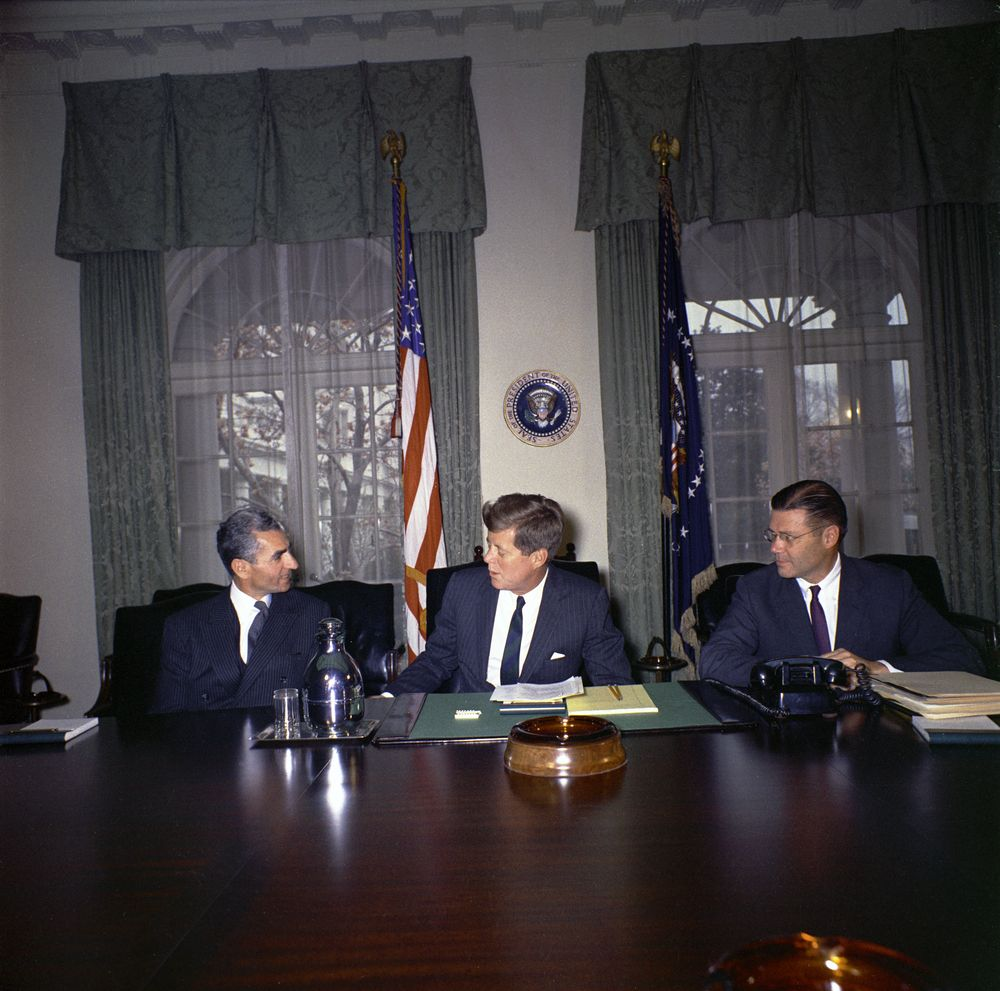
Shah Mohammad Reza Pahlavi of Iran, Kennedy, and U.S. Defense Secretary Robert McNamara in the White House Cabinet Room on April 13, 1962

Kennedy ended the arms embargo that the Truman and Eisenhower administrations had enforced on Israel in favor of increased security ties, becoming the founder of the U.S.-Israeli military alliance. Describing the protection of Israel as a moral and national commitment, he was the first to introduce the concept of a 'special relationship' between the U.S. and Israel. In 1962, the Kennedy administration sold Israel a major weapon system, the Hawk antiaircraft missile. Historians differ as to whether Kennedy pursued security ties with Israel primarily to shore up support with Jewish-American voters or because he admired the Jewish state.

In December 1961, Abd al-Karim Qasim's Iraqi government passed Public Law 80, which restricted the partially American-controlled Iraq Petroleum Company (IPC)'s concessionary holding to those areas in which oil was actually being produced (namely, the fields at Az Zubair and Kirkuk), effectively expropriating 99.5% of the IPC concession. British and U.S. officials demanded that the Kennedy administration place pressure on the Qasim regime. In April 1962, the State Department issued new guidelines on Iraq that were intended to increase American influence. Meanwhile, Kennedy instructed the CIA—under the direction of Archibald Bulloch Roosevelt Jr.—to begin making preparations for a military coup against Qasim.

The anti-imperialist and anti-communist Iraqi Ba'ath Party overthrew and executed Qasim in a violent coup on February 8, 1963. Despite persistent rumors that the CIA orchestrated the coup, declassified documents and the testimony of former CIA officers indicate that there was no direct American involvement. The Kennedy administration was pleased with the outcome and ultimately approved a $55-million arms deal for Iraq.

==== Ireland ====
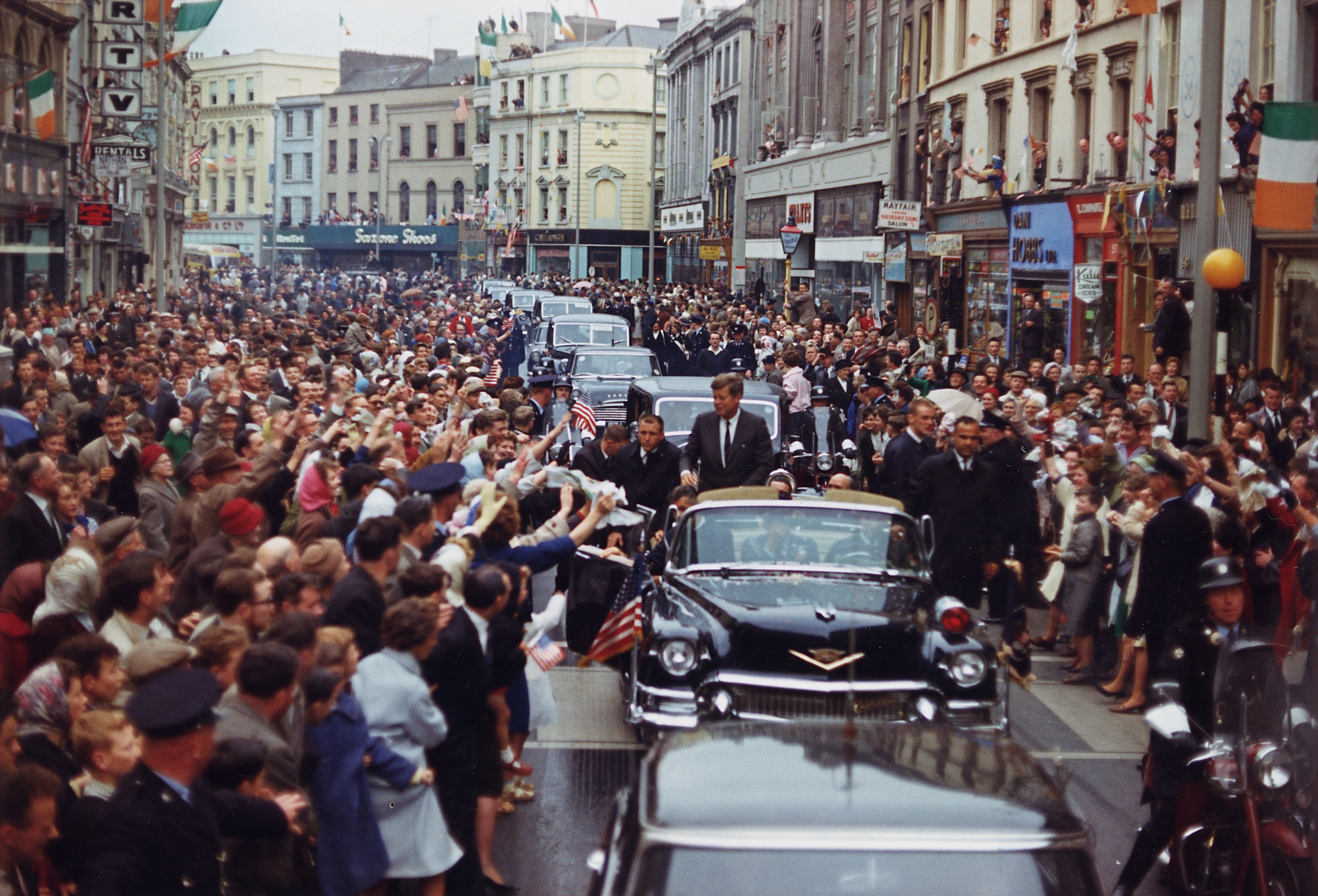
Kennedy's motorcade through Cork, Ireland on June 28, 1963

During his four-day visit to his ancestral home of Ireland beginning on June 26, 1963, Kennedy accepted a grant of armorial bearings from the Chief Herald of Ireland, received honorary degrees from the National University of Ireland and Trinity College Dublin, attended a State Dinner in Dublin, and was conferred with the freedom of the towns and cities of Wexford, Cork, Dublin, Galway, and Limerick. He visited the cottage at Dunganstown, near New Ross, County Wexford, where his ancestors had lived before emigrating to America.

Kennedy was the first foreign leader to address the Houses of the Oireachtas, the Irish parliament. Kennedy later told aides that the trip was the best four days of his life.

==== American University speech ====
World Peace Speech
Speech from American University by John F. Kennedy, June 10, 1963 (duration 26:47)

On June 10, 1963, Kennedy, at the high point of his rhetorical powers, delivered the commencement address at American University. Also known as "A Strategy of Peace", not only did Kennedy outline a plan to curb nuclear arms, but he also "laid out a hopeful, yet realistic route for world peace at a time when the U.S. and Soviet Union faced the potential for an escalating nuclear arms race." Kennedy also announced that the Soviets had expressed a desire to negotiate a nuclear test ban treaty, and that the U.S. had postponed planned atmospheric tests.

==== Nuclear Test Ban Treaty ====
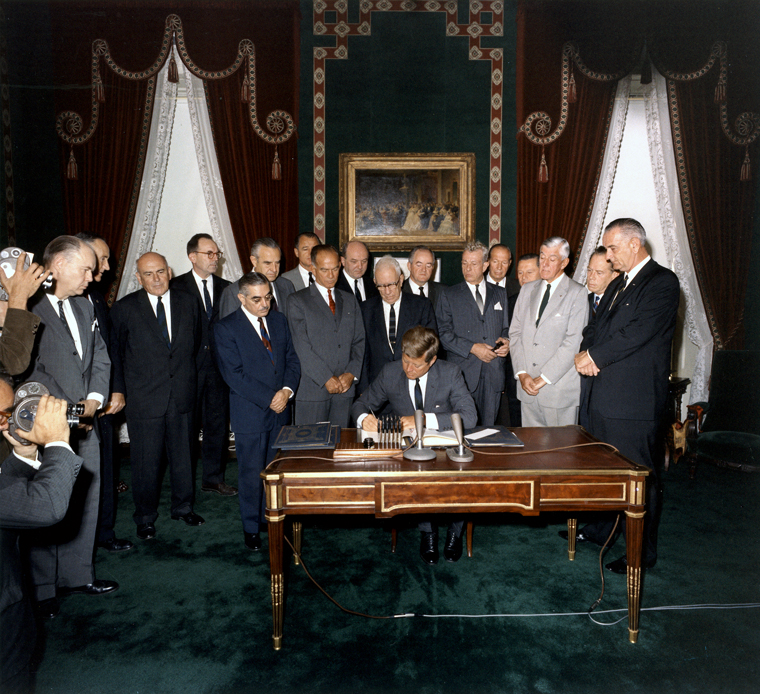
Kennedy signs the Partial Test Ban Treaty, a major milestone in early nuclear disarmament, on October 7, 1963

Troubled by the long-term dangers of radioactive contamination and nuclear proliferation, Kennedy and Khrushchev agreed to negotiate a nuclear test ban treaty, originally conceived in Adlai Stevenson's 1956 presidential campaign. In their Vienna summit meeting in June 1961, Khrushchev and Kennedy reached an informal understanding against nuclear testing, but the Soviet Union began testing nuclear weapons that September. In response, the United States conducted tests five days later. Shortly afterwards, new U.S. satellites began delivering images that made it clear that the Soviets were substantially behind the U.S. in the arms race. Nevertheless, the greater nuclear strength of the U.S. was of little value as long as the Soviet Union perceived itself to be at parity.

In July 1963, Kennedy sent W. Averell Harriman to Moscow to negotiate a treaty with the Soviets. The introductory sessions included Khrushchev, who later delegated Soviet representation to Andrei Gromyko. It quickly became clear that a comprehensive test ban would not be implemented, due largely to the reluctance of the Soviets to allow inspections to verify compliance.

Ultimately, the United States, the United Kingdom, and the Soviet Union were the initial signatories to a limited treaty, which prohibited atomic testing on the ground, in the atmosphere, or underwater, but not underground. The U.S. Senate approved the treaty on September 23, 1963, and Kennedy signed it on October 7, 1963. France was quick to declare that it was free to continue developing and testing its nuclear defenses.

=== Domestic policy ===
==== New Frontier ====
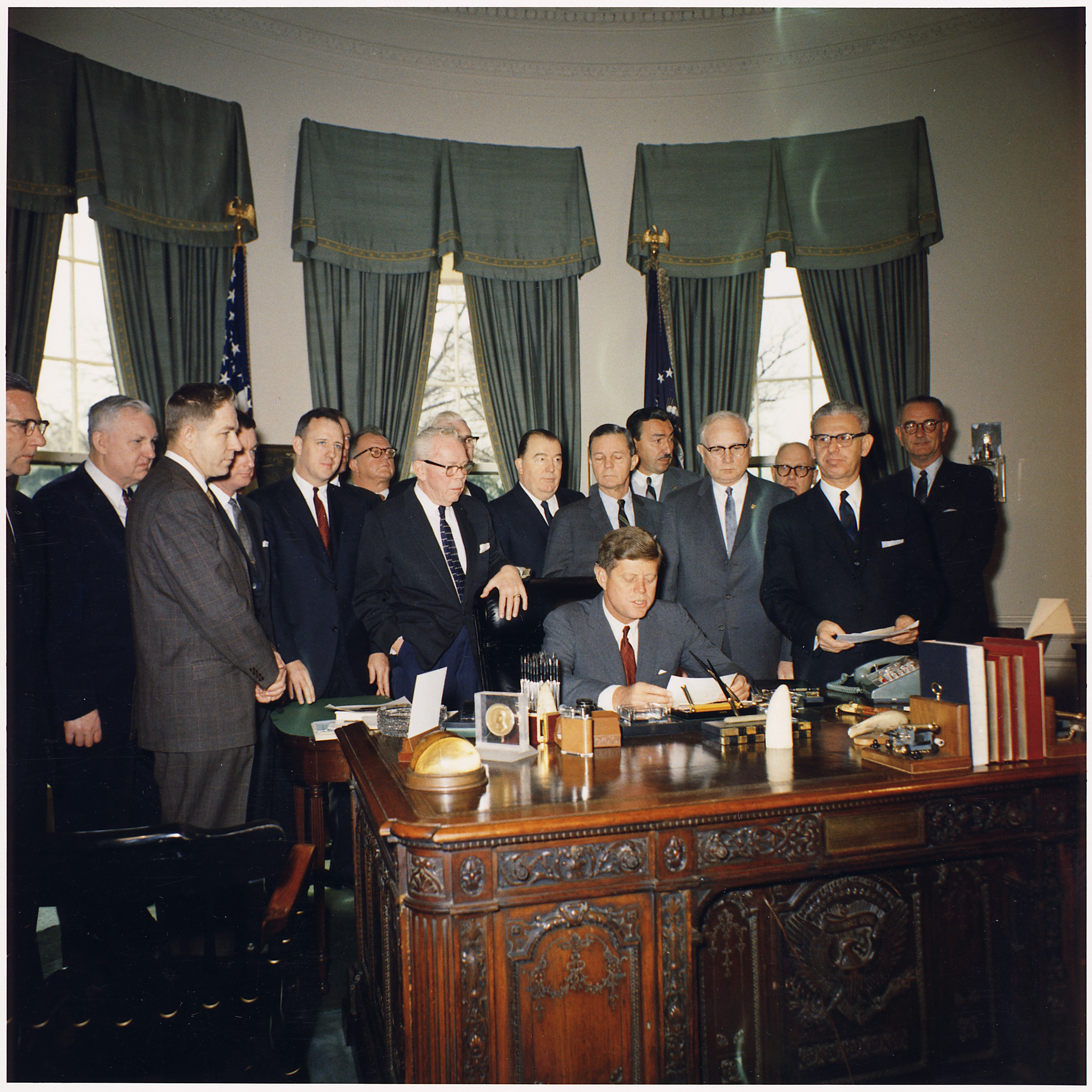
Kennedy signing the Manpower Development and Training Act, March 15, 1962

Kennedy called his domestic proposals the "New Frontier". However, Kennedy's small margin of victory in the 1960 election, his lack of deep connections to influential members of Congress, and his administration's focus on foreign policy hindered the passage of New Frontier policies.

In 1961, Kennedy prioritized passing five bills: federal assistance for education, medical insurance for the elderly, housing legislation, federal aid to struggling areas, and an increase in the federal minimum wage. Kennedy's bill to increase the federal minimum wage to $1.25 an hour passed in early 1961, but an amendment inserted by conservative leader from Georgia, Carl Vinson, exempted laundry workers from the law. Kennedy also won passage of the Area Redevelopment Act and the Housing Act of 1961. The Area Redevelopment Act, a $394 million program, provided federal funding to economically struggling regions (primarily in Appalachia), while the Housing Act of 1961 provided funds for urban renewal and public housing and authorized federal mortgage loans to those who did not qualify for public housing. Kennedy proposed a bill providing for $2.3 billion in federal educational aid to the states, with more money going to states with lower per capita income. Though the Senate passed the education bill, it was defeated in the House by a coalition of Republicans, Southern Democrats, and Catholics. Kennedy's health insurance bill, which would have paid for hospitalization and nursing costs for the elderly, failed to pass either house of Congress. A bill that would have established the Department of Urban Affairs and Housing was also defeated.

In 1962, Kennedy won approval of the Manpower Development and Training Act, a three-year program aimed at retraining workers displaced by new technology. Its impact on structural unemployment, however, was minimal. At the urging of his sister Eunice, Kennedy made intellectual disabilities a priority for his administration. In 1963, Congress passed the Community Mental Health Act, which provided funding to local mental health community centers and research facilities.

Trade policy included both domestic and foreign policy. The 1962 Trade Expansion Act was passed by Congress with wide majorities. It authorized the president to negotiate tariff reductions on a reciprocal basis of up to 50 percent with the European Common Market. The legislation paved the way for the Kennedy Round of General Agreement on Tariffs and Trade negotiations, concluding on June 30, 1967, the last day before expiration of the Act.

==== Taxes ====
Walter Heller, who served as the chairman of the CEA, advocated for a Keynesian-style tax cut designed to help spur economic growth, and Kennedy adopted this policy. The idea was that a tax cut would stimulate consumer demand, which in turn would lead to higher economic growth, lower unemployment, and increased federal revenues. To the disappointment of liberals like John Kenneth Galbraith, Kennedy's embrace of the tax cut shifted his administration's focus away from the proposed old-age health insurance program and other domestic expenditures. In January 1963, Kennedy proposed a tax cut that would reduce the top marginal tax rate from 91 to 65 percent, and lower the corporate tax rate from 52 to 47 percent. The predictions according to the Keynesian model indicated the cuts would decrease income taxes by about $10 billion and corporate taxes by about $3.5 billion. The plan included reforms designed to reduce the impact of itemized deductions, as well as provisions to help the elderly and handicapped. Republicans and many Southern Democrats opposed the bill, calling for simultaneous reductions in expenditures, but debate continued throughout 1963. Three months after Kennedy died, Johnson pushed the plan through Congress. The Revenue Act of 1964 lowered the top individual rate to 70 percent, and the top corporate rate to 48 percent.

==== Economy ====
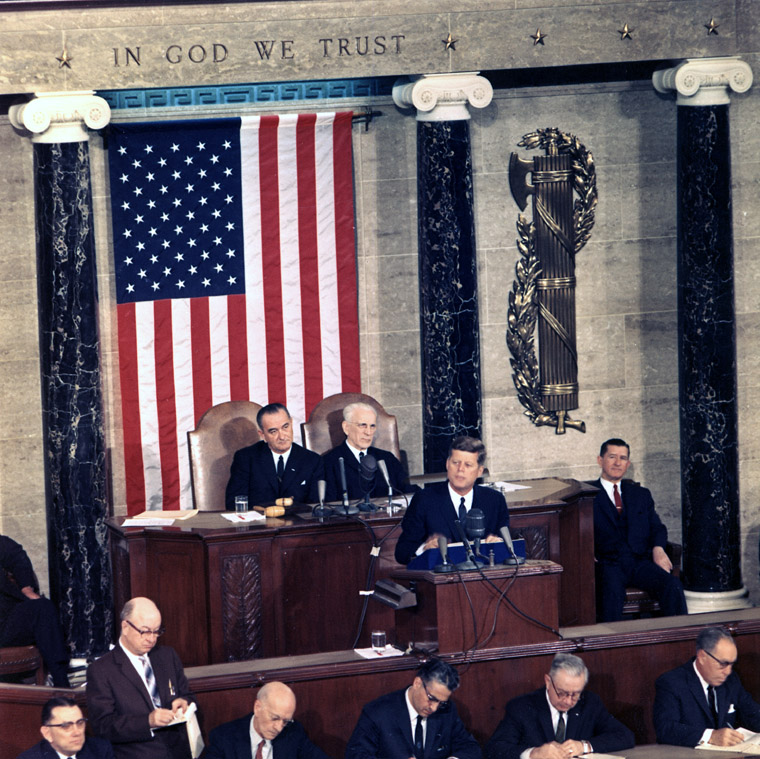
President Kennedy delivers his State of the Union Address; c. January 14, 1963

Kennedy ended a period of tight fiscal policies, loosening monetary policy to keep interest rates down and to encourage growth of the economy. He presided over the first government budget to top the $100 billion mark, in 1962, and his first budget in 1961 resulted in the nation's first non-war, non-recession deficit. The economy, which had been through two recessions in three years and was in one when Kennedy took office, accelerated notably throughout his administration. Despite low inflation and interest rates, the GDP had grown by an average of only 2.2% per annum during the Eisenhower administration (scarcely more than population growth at the time), and it had declined by 1% during Eisenhower's last twelve months in office.

The economy turned around and prospered during Kennedy's presidency. The GDP expanded by an average of 5.5% from early 1961 to late 1963, while inflation remained steady at around 1% and unemployment eased. Industrial production rose by 15% and motor vehicle sales increased by 40%. This sustained rate of growth in GDP and industry continued until around 1969.

Kennedy was proud that his Labor Department helped keep wages steady in the steel industry, but was outraged in April 1962 when Roger Blough, the president of U.S. Steel, quietly informed Kennedy that his company would raise prices. In response, Attorney General Robert Kennedy began a price-fixing investigation against U.S. Steel, and President Kennedy convinced other steel companies to rescind their price increases until finally even U.S. Steel, isolated and in danger of being undersold, agreed to rescind its own price increase. An editorial in The New York Times praised Kennedy's actions and stated that the steel industry's price increase "imperil[ed] the economic welfare of the country by inviting a tidal wave of inflation". Nevertheless, the administration's Bureau of Budget reported the price increase would have caused a net gain for the GDP as well as a net budget surplus. The stock market, which had steadily declined since Kennedy's election in 1960, dropped 10% shortly after the administration's action on the steel industry took place.

==== Civil rights movement ====
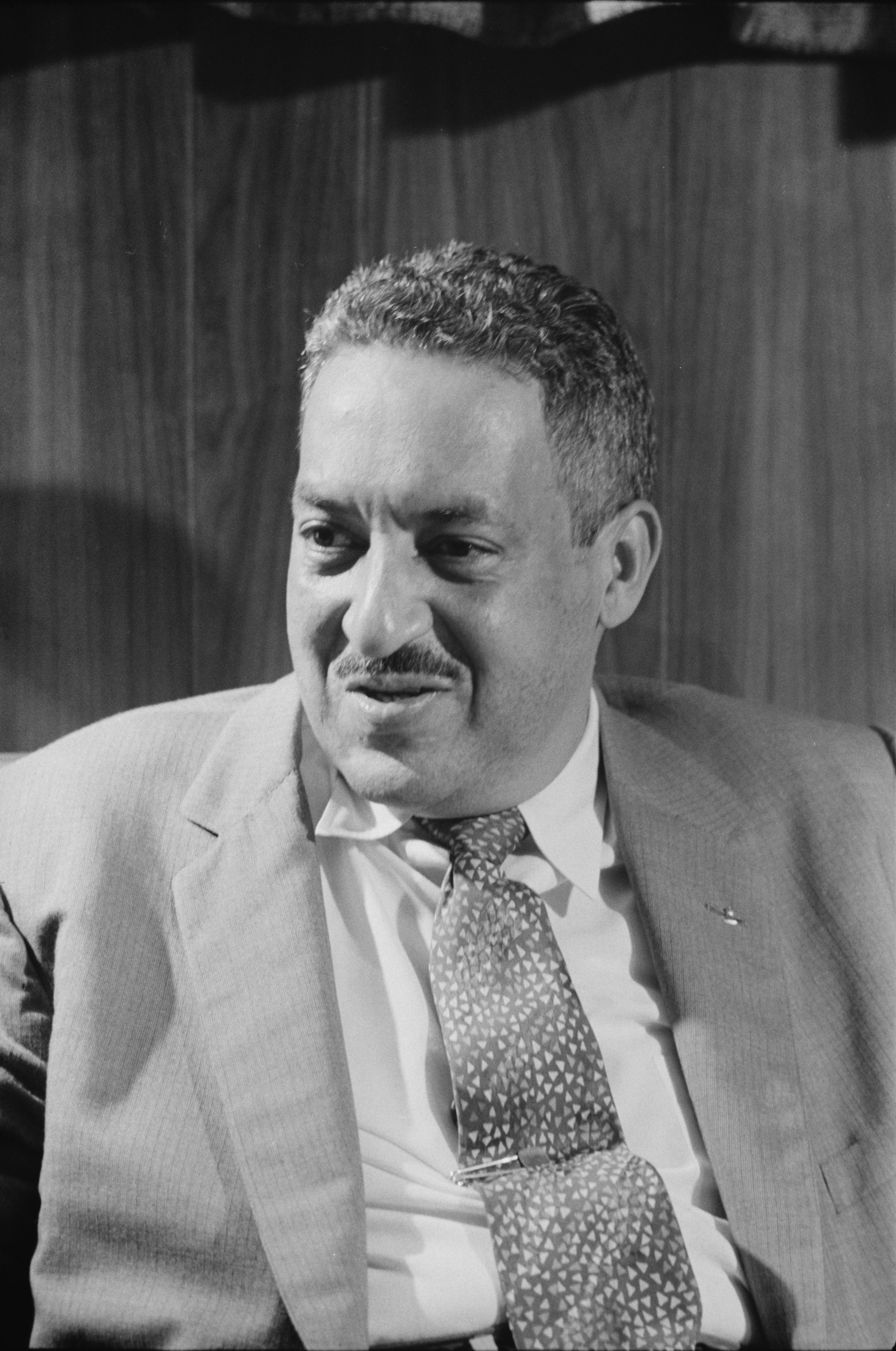
In May 1961, Kennedy appointed Thurgood Marshall to the U.S. Court of Appeals.

Kennedy verbally supported civil rights during his 1960 presidential campaign; he telephoned Coretta Scott King, wife of Martin Luther King Jr., who had been jailed while trying to integrate a department store lunch counter. Robert Kennedy called Georgia Governor Ernest Vandiver and obtained King's release from prison, which drew additional Black support to his brother's candidacy. Recognizing that conservative Southern Democrats could block legislation, Kennedy did not introduce civil rights legislation on taking office. He needed their support to pass his economic and foreign policy agendas, and to support his reelection in 1964. Kennedy did appoint many Blacks to office, including civil rights attorney Thurgood Marshall to the U.S. Court of Appeals. Abraham Bolden, the first black Secret Service agent, was appointed by Kennedy.

Kennedy believed the grassroots movement for civil rights would anger many Southern Whites and make it more difficult to pass civil rights laws in Congress, and he distanced himself from it. As articulated by Robert Kennedy, the administration's early priority was to "keep the president out of this civil rights mess". Civil rights movement participants, mainly those on the front line in the South, viewed Kennedy as lukewarm, especially concerning the Freedom Riders. In May 1961, the Congress of Racial Equality, led by James Farmer, organized integrated Freedom Rides to test a Supreme Court case ruling that declared segregation on interstate transportation illegal. The Riders were repeatedly met with mob violence, including by federal and state law enforcement officers. Kennedy assigned federal marshals to protect the Riders rather than using federal troops or uncooperative FBI agents. Kennedy feared sending federal troops would stir up "hated memories of Reconstruction" among conservative Southern whites. The Justice Department then petitioned the Interstate Commerce Commission (ICC) to adhere to federal law. By September 1961, the ICC ruled in favor of the petition.

On March 6, 1961, Kennedy signed Executive Order 10925, which required government contractors to "take affirmative action to ensure that applicants are employed and that employees are treated during employment without regard to their race, creed, color, or national origin." It established the President's Committee on Equal Employment Opportunity.

In September 1962, James Meredith enrolled at the all-White University of Mississippi but was prevented from entering. In response, Attorney General Robert Kennedy sent 400 federal marshals. The Ole Miss riot of 1962 left two dead and dozens injured, prompting Kennedy to send in 3,000 troops to quell the riot. Meredith did finally enroll in class. Kennedy regretted not sending in troops earlier and he began to doubt whether the "evils of Reconstruction" he had been taught or believed were true. On November 20, 1962, Kennedy signed Executive Order 11063, which prohibited racial discrimination in federally supported housing.

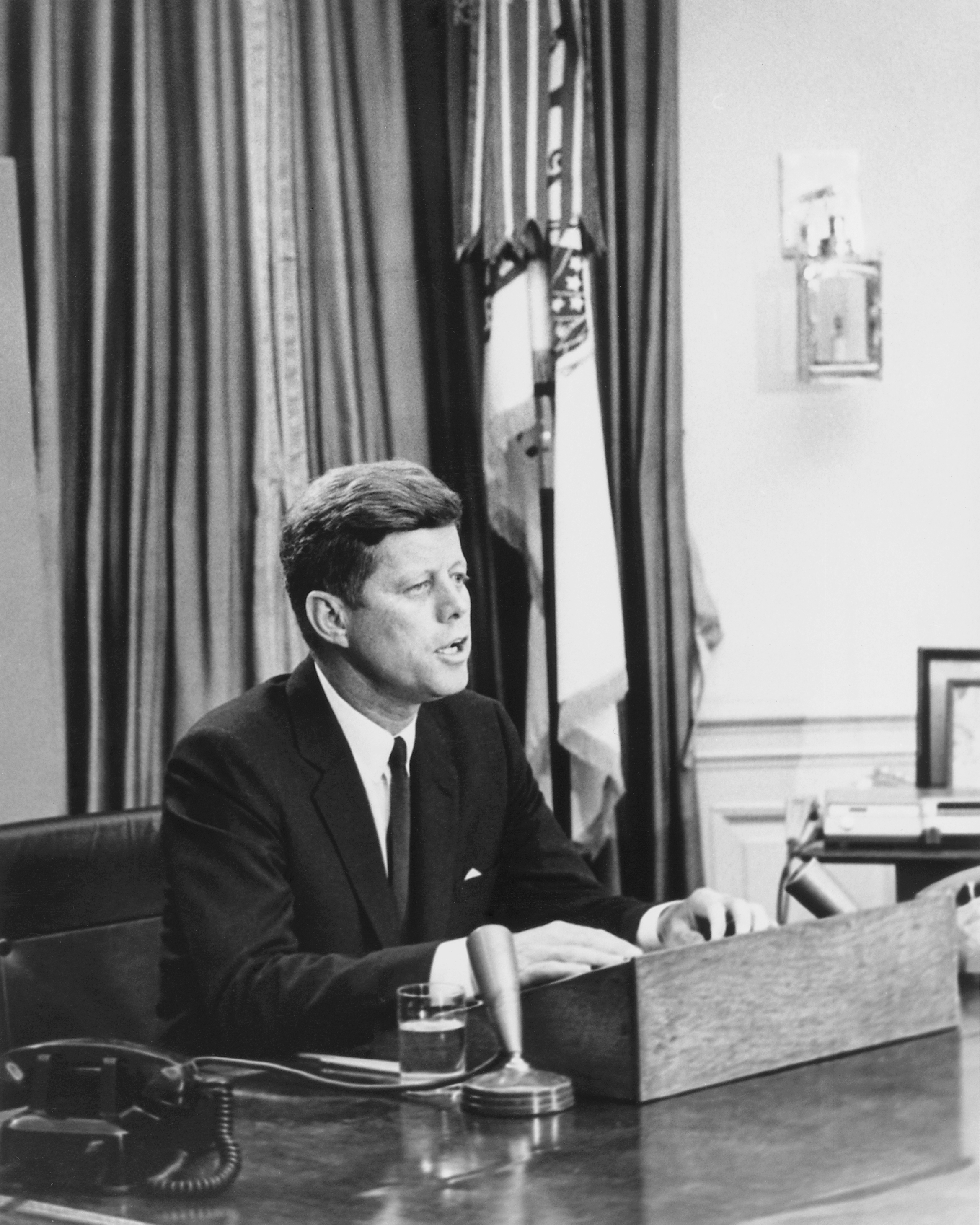
Kennedy's Report to the American People on Civil Rights, c. June 11, 1963

On June 11, 1963, Kennedy intervened when Alabama Governor George Wallace blocked the doorway to the University of Alabama to stop two Black students, Vivian Malone and James Hood, from attending. Wallace moved aside only after being confronted by Deputy Attorney General Nicholas Katzenbach and the Alabama National Guard, which had just been federalized by order of the president. That evening Kennedy gave his famous Report to the American People on Civil Rights speech on national television and radio, launching his initiative for civil rights legislation—to provide equal access to public schools and other facilities, and greater protection of voting rights.

His proposals became part of the Civil Rights Act of 1964. The day ended with the murder of an NAACP leader, Medgar Evers, in Mississippi. As Kennedy had predicted, the day after his TV speech, and in reaction to it, House Majority leader Carl Albert called to advise him that his two-year signature effort in Congress to combat poverty in Appalachia had been defeated, primarily by the votes of Southern Democrats and Republicans. When Arthur Schlesinger Jr. complimented Kennedy on his remarks, Kennedy bitterly replied, "Yes, and look at what happened to area development the very next day in the House." He then added, "But of course, I had to give that speech, and I'm glad that I did." On June 16, The New York Times published an editorial which argued that while Kennedy had initially "moved too slowly and with little evidence of deep moral commitment" in regards to civil rights he "now demonstrate[d] a genuine sense of urgency about eradicating racial discrimination from our national life".

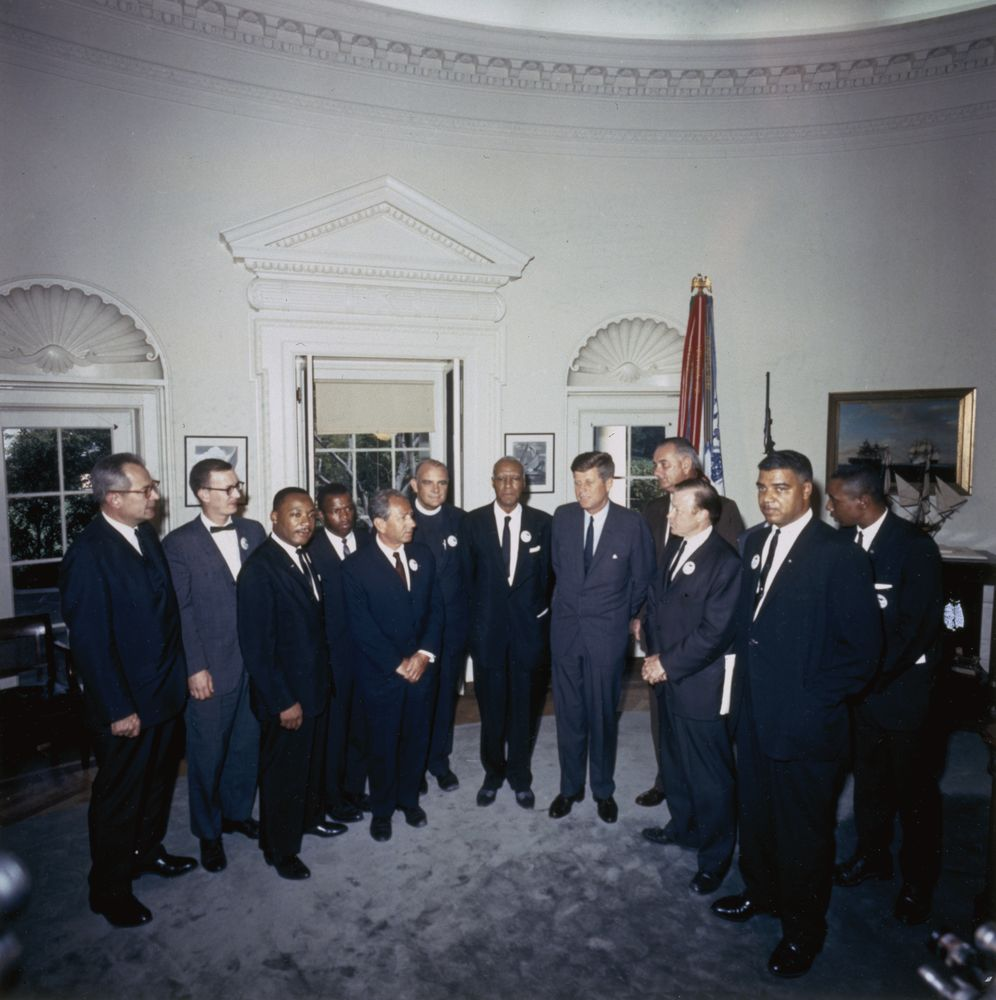
Kennedy meetings with leaders of the March on Washington in the Oval Office, c. August 28, 1963

A crowd of over 250,000, predominantly African Americans, gathered in Washington for the civil rights March on Washington for Jobs and Freedom on August 28, 1963. Kennedy initially opposed the march, fearing it would have a negative effect on the prospects for the civil rights bills pending in Congress. These fears were heightened just prior to the march when FBI Director J. Edgar Hoover presented Kennedy with reports that some of King's close advisers, specifically Jack O'Dell and Stanley Levison, were communists. When King ignored the administration's warning, Robert Kennedy authorized the FBI to wiretap King and other leaders of the Southern Christian Leadership Conference. Although Kennedy only gave written approval for limited wiretapping of King's phones "on a trial basis, for a month or so", Hoover extended the clearance so his men were "unshackled" to look for evidence in any areas of King's life they deemed worthy.

The Department of Justice was assigned to coordinate the federal government's involvement in the March on Washington on August 28; several hundred thousand dollars were channeled to the six sponsors of the March. To ensure a peaceful demonstration, the organizers and the president personally edited speeches that were inflammatory and collaborated on all aspects related to times and venues. Thousands of troops were placed on standby. Kennedy watched King's speech on TV and was very impressed. The March was considered a "triumph of managed protest", and not one arrest relating to the demonstration occurred. Afterwards, the March leaders accepted an invitation to the White House to meet with Kennedy, and photos were taken. Kennedy felt that the March was a victory for him as well and bolstered the chances for his civil rights bill.

Three weeks later, on September 15, a bomb exploded at the 16th Street Baptist Church in Birmingham; by the end of the day, four Black children had died in the explosion, and two others were shot to death in the aftermath. Due to this resurgent violence, the civil rights legislation underwent some drastic amendments that critically endangered any prospects for passage of the bill, to the outrage of Kennedy. He called the congressional leaders to the White House, and by the following day, the original bill, without the additions, had enough votes to get it out of the House committee. Gaining Republican support, Senator Everett Dirksen promised the legislation would be brought to a vote preventing a Senate filibuster. On July 2, 1964, the guarantees Kennedy proposed in his June 1963 speech became federal law, when President Johnson signed the Civil Rights Act.

==== Status of women ====
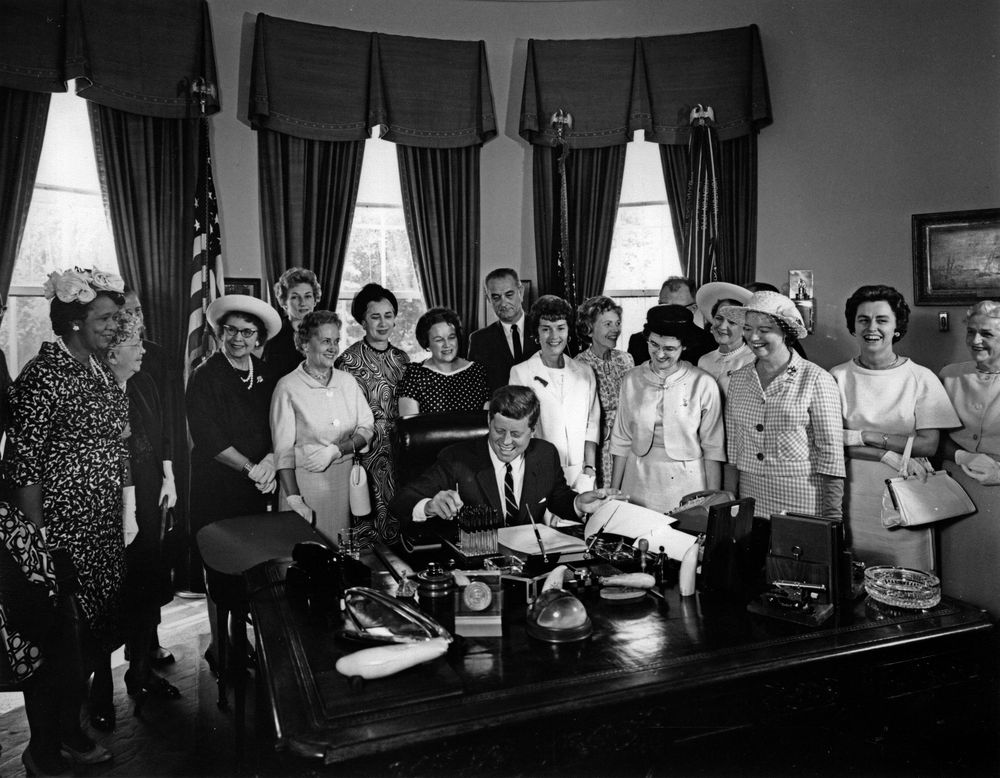
Kennedy signing the Equal Pay Act of 1963 into law

During the 1960 presidential campaign, Kennedy endorsed the concept of equal pay for equal work. In December 1961, Kennedy signed an executive order creating the Presidential Commission on the Status of Women to advise him on issues concerning the status of women. Former First Lady Eleanor Roosevelt led the commission. The commission's final report was issued in October 1963; it documented the legal and cultural discrimination women in America faced and made several policy recommendations to bring about change. On June 10, 1963, Kennedy signed the Equal Pay Act of 1963, which amended the Fair Labor Standards Act and sought to reduce wage disparity based on sex.

==== Crime ====
Under the leadership of the attorney general, the Kennedy administration shifted the focus of the Justice Department, the FBI, and the IRS to organized crime. Kennedy won congressional approval for five bills (i.e., Federal Wire Act of 1961) designed to crack down on interstate racketeering, gambling, and the transportation of firearms.

On March 22, 1962, Kennedy signed into law a bill abolishing the mandatory death penalty for first degree murder in the District of Columbia, the only remaining jurisdiction in the United States with such a penalty. The death penalty has not been applied in D.C. since 1957 and has now been abolished.

==== Agriculture ====
Kennedy had relatively little interest in agricultural issues, but he sought to remedy the issue of overproduction, boost the income of farmers, and lower federal expenditures on agriculture. Under the direction of Secretary of Agriculture Orville Freeman, the administration sought to limit the production of farmers, but these proposals were generally defeated in Congress. To increase demand for domestic agricultural products and help the impoverished, Kennedy launched a pilot Food Stamp program and expanded the federal school lunch program.

==== Native American relations ====
Construction of the Kinzua Dam flooded 10,000 acres (4,000 hectares) of Seneca nation land that they had occupied under the Treaty of 1794, and forced 600 Seneca to relocate to Salamanca, New York. Kennedy was asked by the American Civil Liberties Union to halt the project, but he declined, citing a critical need for flood control. He expressed concern about the plight of the Seneca and directed government agencies to assist in obtaining more land, damages, and assistance to mitigate their displacement.

==== Space policy ====
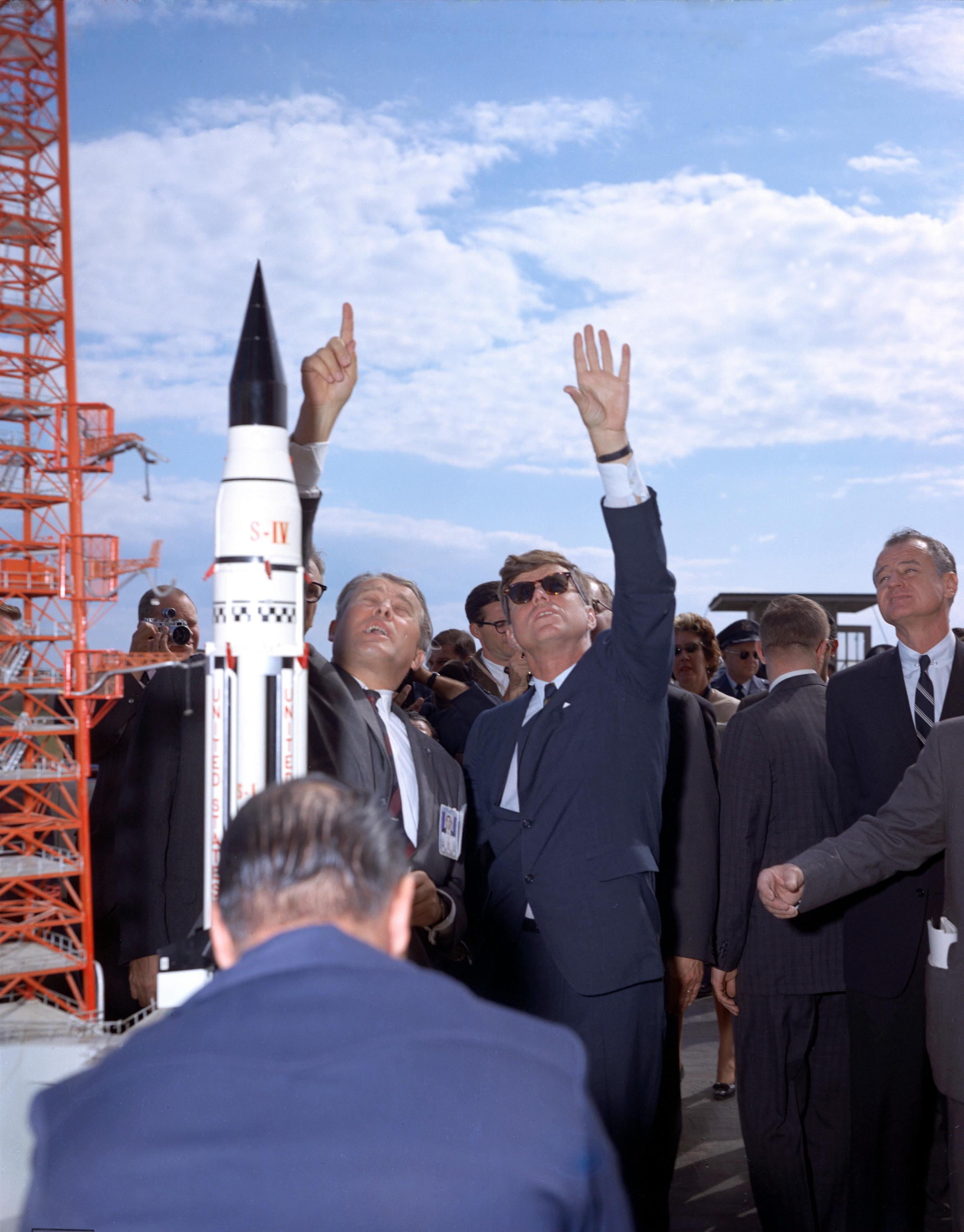
Wernher von Braun explains the Saturn system to President Kennedy during his tour at the Cape Canaveral Missile Test Annex on November 16, 1963

In the aftermath of the Soviet launch of Sputnik 1, the first artificial Earth satellite, NASA proposed a crewed lunar landing by the early 1970s. Funding for the program, known as the Apollo program, was far from certain as Eisenhower held an ambivalent attitude. Early in his presidency, Kennedy was poised to dismantle the crewed space program, but he postponed any decision out of deference to Vice President Johnson, who had been a strong supporter of the program in the Senate. With Jerome Wiesner, Johnson was given a major role in overseeing the administration's space policy, and at Johnson's recommendation, Kennedy appointed James E. Webb to head NASA.

In Kennedy's State of the Union address in 1961, he suggested international cooperation in space. Khrushchev declined, as the Soviets did not wish to reveal the status of their rocketry and space capabilities. In April 1961, Soviet cosmonaut Yuri Gagarin became the first person to fly in space, reinforcing American fears about being left behind by the Soviet Union. Less than a month later, Alan Shepard became the first American to travel into space, strengthening Kennedy's confidence in NASA. The following year, John Glenn, aboard the Mercury craft Friendship 7, became the first American to orbit the Earth.

In the aftermath of Gagarin's flight, as well as the failed Bay of Pigs invasion, Kennedy felt pressured to respond to the perceived erosion of American prestige. He asked Johnson to explore the feasibility of beating the Soviets to the Moon. Though he was concerned about the program's costs, Kennedy agreed to Johnson's recommendation that the U.S. commit to a crewed lunar landing as the major objective of the space program. In a May 25 speech to Congress, Kennedy declared,

... I believe that this nation should commit itself to achieving the goal, before this decade is out, of landing a man on the Moon and returning him safely to the Earth. No single space project in this period will be more impressive to mankind, or more important for the long-range exploration of space; and none will be so difficult or expensive to accomplish.

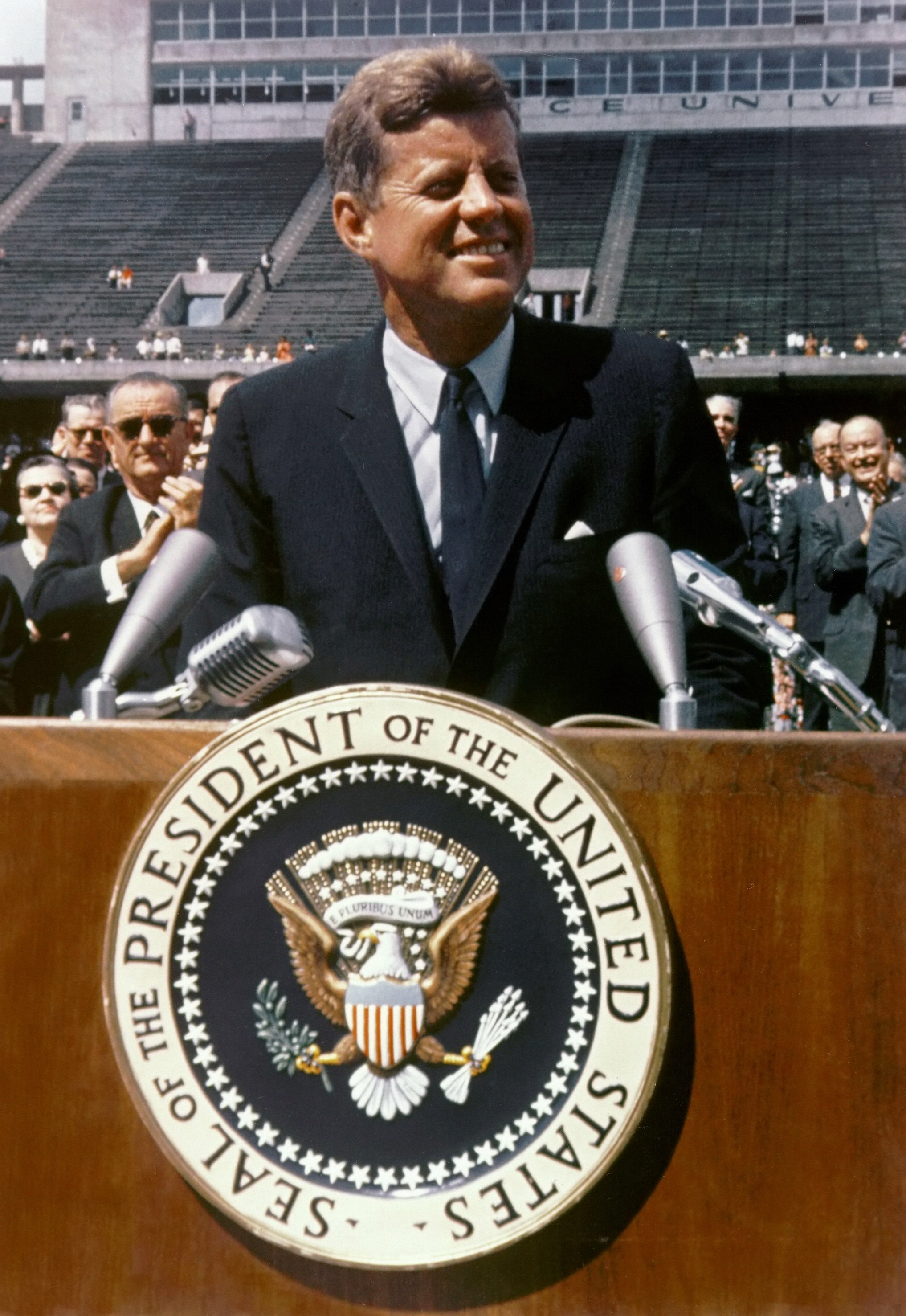
Kennedy speaks at Rice University on September 12, 1962

Though Gallup polling showed that many in the public were skeptical of the necessity of the Apollo program, members of Congress were strongly supportive in 1961 and approved a major increase in NASA's funding. Webb began reorganizing NASA, increasing its staffing level, and building two new centers: a Launch Operations Center for the large Moon rocket northwest of Cape Canaveral Air Force Station, and a Manned Spacecraft Center in Houston. Kennedy took the latter occasion as an opportunity to deliver another speech promoting the space effort on September 12, 1962, in which he said:

No nation which expects to be the leader of other nations can expect to stay behind in this race for space. ... We choose to go to the Moon in this decade and do the other things, not because they are easy, but because they are hard.

On November 21, 1962, in a cabinet meeting with Webb and other officials, Kennedy explained that the Moon shot was important for reasons of international prestige, and that the expense was justified. On July 20, 1969, almost six years after Kennedy's death, Apollo 11 landed the first crewed spacecraft on the Moon.

=== Judicial appointments ===
In 1962, Kennedy appointed justices Byron White and Arthur Goldberg to the Supreme Court. Additionally, Kennedy appointed 21 judges to the United States Courts of Appeals, and 102 judges to the United States district courts.

== Assassination ==
Kennedy was assassinated in Dallas at 12:30 p.m. Central Standard Time on November 22, 1963. He was in Texas on a political trip to smooth over frictions in the Democratic Party between liberals Ralph Yarborough and Don Yarborough (no relation) and conservative John Connally. While traveling in a presidential motorcade through Dealey Plaza, he was shot once in the back, the bullet exiting via his throat, and once in the head.

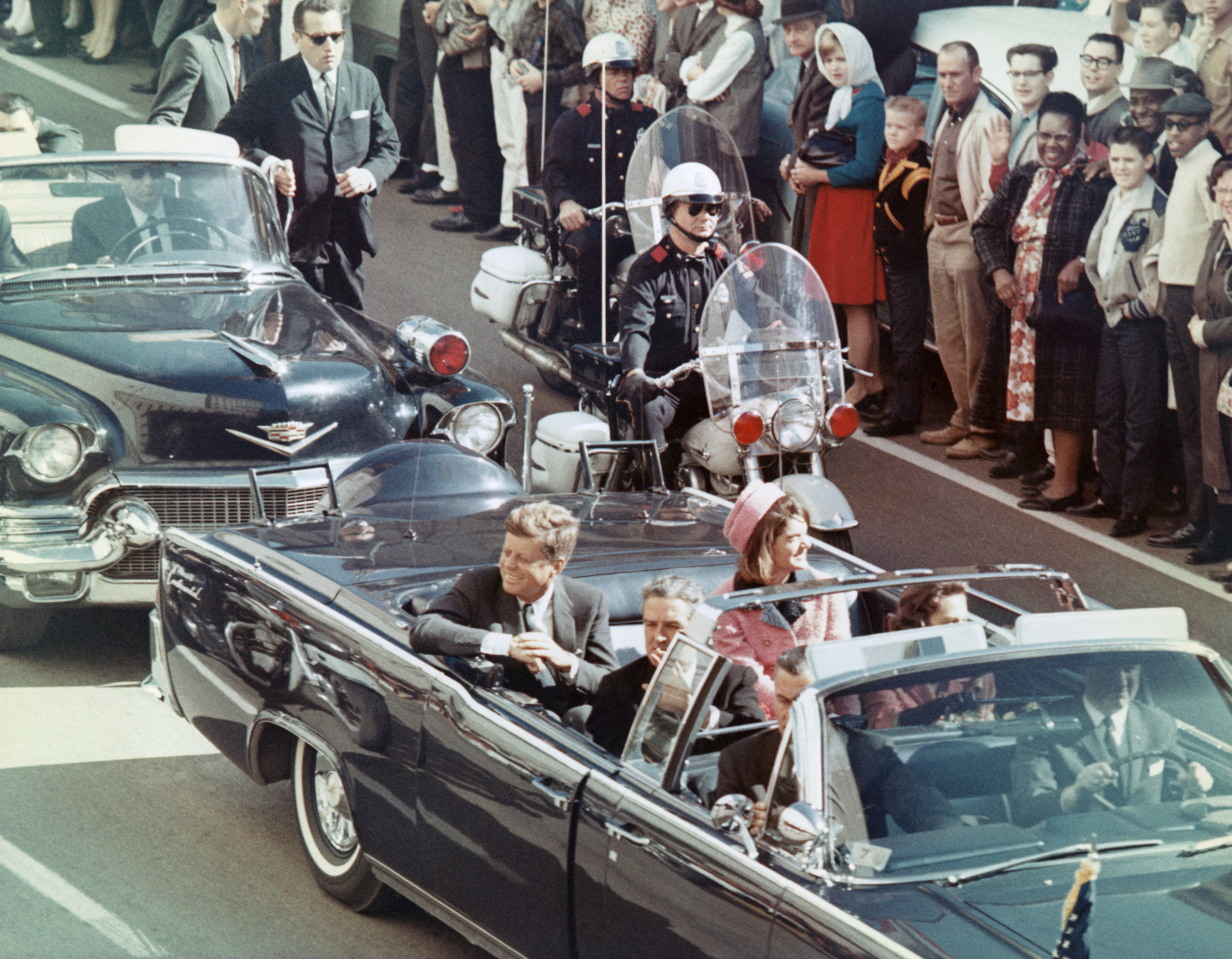
The Kennedys and the Connallys in the presidential limousine moments before the assassination in Dallas

Kennedy was taken to Parkland Hospital, where he was pronounced dead 30 minutes later, at 1:00 pm. He was 46 years old. Lee Harvey Oswald was arrested for the murder of police officer J. D. Tippit and was subsequently charged with Kennedy's assassination. Oswald denied shooting anyone, claiming he was a patsy. On November 24, before he could be prosecuted, he was shot and killed by Jack Ruby. Ruby was arrested and convicted for the murder of Oswald. Ruby successfully appealed his conviction but died of cancer on January 3, 1967, while the date for his new trial was being set.

President Johnson quickly issued an executive order to create the Warren Commission—chaired by Chief Justice Earl Warren—to investigate the assassination. The commission concluded that Oswald acted alone in killing Kennedy and that Oswald was not part of any conspiracy. These conclusions are disputed by many. A Gallup Poll in November 2013 showed 61% believed in a conspiracy, and only 30% thought that Oswald did it alone. In 1979, the U.S. House Select Committee on Assassinations concluded, with one third of the committee dissenting, "that Kennedy was probably assassinated as a result of a conspiracy". The committee was unable to identify the other gunmen or the extent of the conspiracy. This conclusion was based largely on audio recordings of the shooting. Subsequently, investigative reports from the FBI and a specially appointed National Academy of Sciences Committee determined that "reliable acoustic data do not support a conclusion that there was a second gunman." The Justice Department later concluded "that no persuasive evidence can be identified to support the theory of a conspiracy".

=== Funeral ===
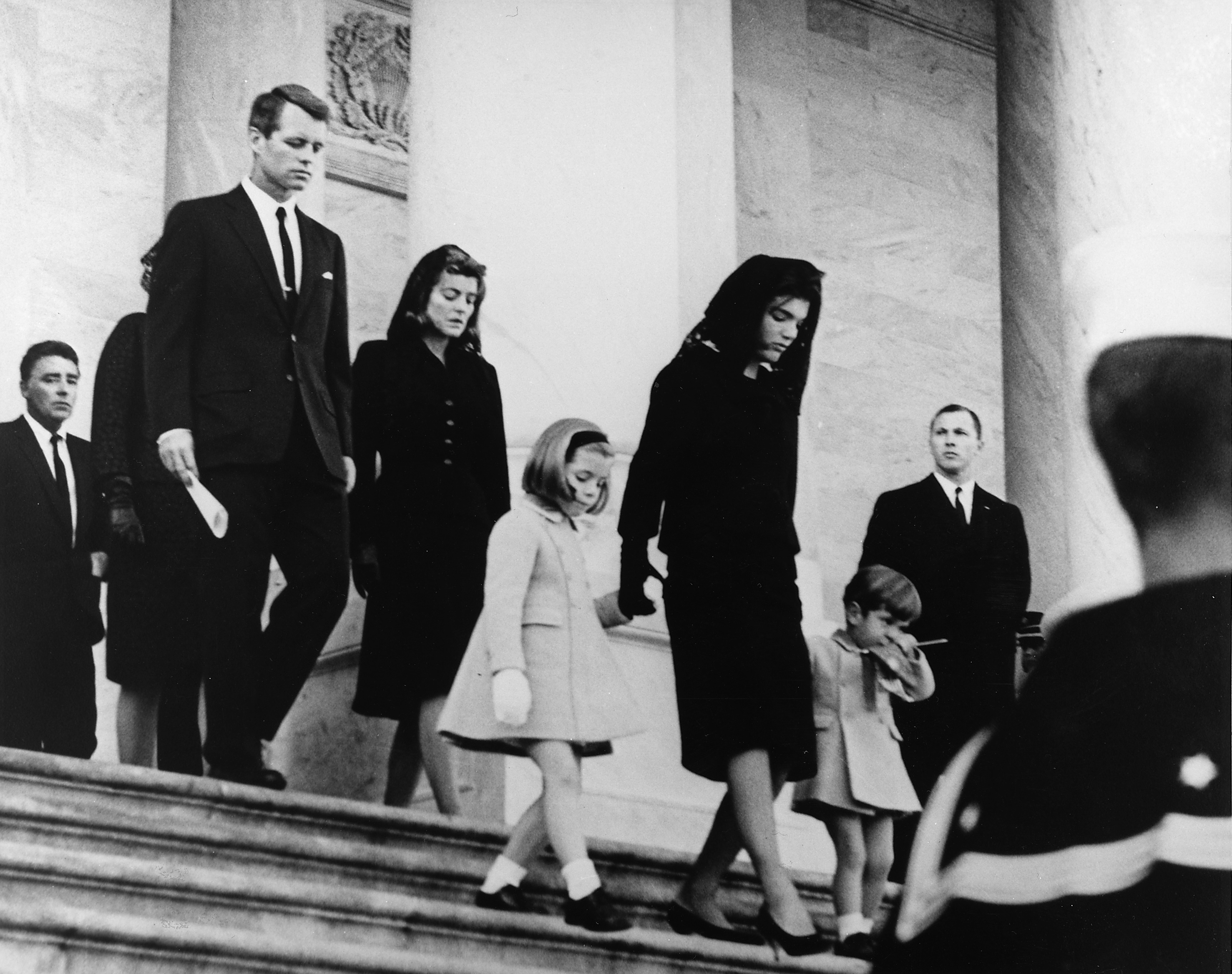
Kennedy's family leaving his funeral at the U.S. Capitol Building

Kennedy's body was brought back to Washington. On November 23, six military pallbearers carried the flag-draped coffin into the East Room of the White House, where he lay in repose for 24 hours. The coffin was then transported on a horse-drawn caisson to the Capitol to lie in state. Throughout the day and night, hundreds of thousands of people lined up to view the guarded casket, with a quarter million passing through the rotunda during the 18 hours of lying in state.

Kennedy's funeral service was held on November 25, at Cathedral of St. Matthew the Apostle in Washington, D.C. The Requiem Mass was led by Cardinal Richard Cushing, then the Archbishop of Boston. It was attended by approximately 1,200 guests, including representatives from over 90 countries. After the service, Kennedy was buried at Arlington National Cemetery in Arlington County, Virginia.

== Personal life, family, and reputation ==
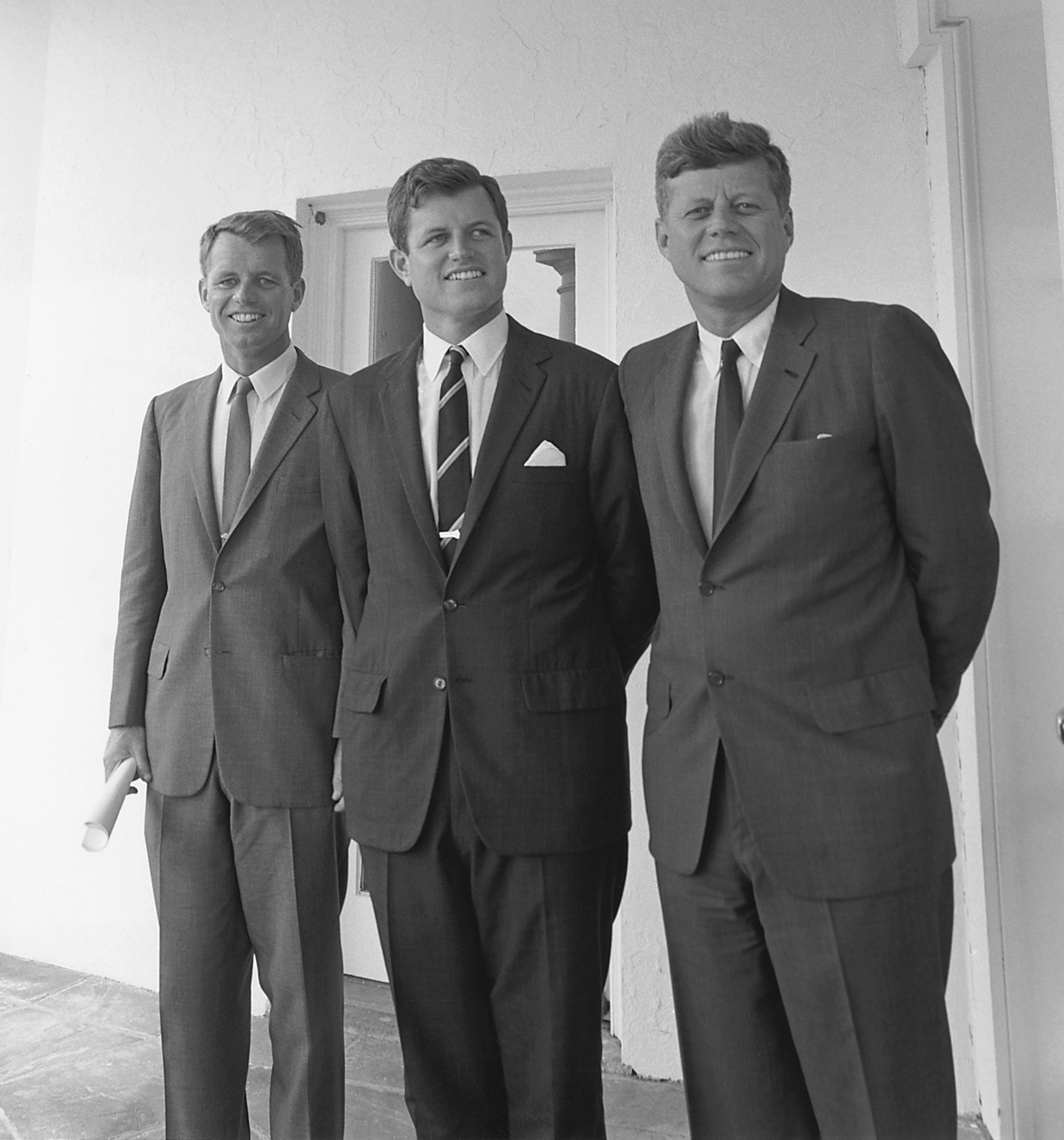
The Kennedy brothers: Attorney General Robert F. Kennedy, Senator Ted Kennedy, and President John F. Kennedy at the White House in 1963

The Kennedy family is one of the most established political families in the United States, having produced a president, three senators, three ambassadors, and numerous other representatives and public officials. While a congressman, Kennedy embarked on a seven-week trip to India, Japan, Vietnam, and Israel in 1951, at which point he became close with his then 25-year-old brother Robert, as well as his 27-year-old sister Patricia. Because they were several years apart in age, the brothers had previously seen little of each other. This 25,000-mile (40,000 km) journey was the first extended time they had spent together and resulted in their becoming best friends. Robert would eventually serve as his brother's attorney general and closest presidential advisor; he would later run for president in 1968 before his assassination, while another Kennedy brother, Ted, ran for president in 1980.

=== Wife and children ===
Kennedy met his wife, Jacqueline Lee "Jackie" Bouvier, when he was a congressman. Charles L. Bartlett, a journalist, introduced the pair at a dinner party. They were married on September 12, 1953, at St. Mary's Church in Newport, Rhode Island. The newlyweds honeymooned in Mexico before settling in their new home, Hickory Hill, in McLean, Virginia. In 1956, they sold their Hickory Hill estate to Kennedy's brother Robert, and bought a townhouse in Georgetown. The Kennedys also resided at an apartment in Boston, their legal residence during John's congressional career, and a summer home in Cape Cod, Massachusetts.

After a miscarriage in 1955 and a stillbirth in 1956 (their daughter Arabella), their daughter Caroline was born in 1957. John Jr., nicknamed "John-John" by the press as a child, was born in late November 1960, 17 days after his father was elected. John Jr. died in 1999 when the small plane he was piloting crashed. In August 1963, Jackie gave birth to a son, Patrick; however, he died after two days due to complications from birth.

=== Popular image ===
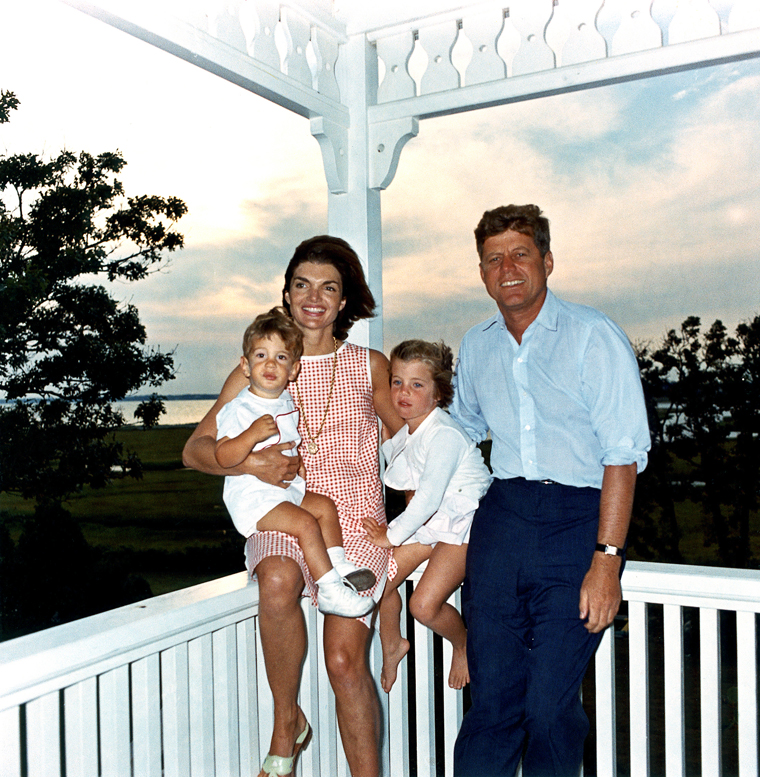
The First Family in Hyannis Port, Massachusetts, 1962

Kennedy and his wife were younger than the presidents and first ladies who preceded them, and both were popular in the media culture in ways more common to pop singers and movie stars than politicians, influencing fashion trends and becoming the subjects of photo spreads in popular magazines. Although Eisenhower had allowed presidential press conferences to be filmed for television, Kennedy was the first president to ask for them to be broadcast live and made good use of the medium. In 1961, the Radio-Television News Directors Association presented Kennedy with its highest honor, the Paul White Award, in recognition of his open relationship with the media.

The Kennedys invited a range of artists, writers, and intellectuals to White House dinners, raising the profile of the arts in America. On the White House lawn, they established a swimming pool and tree house, while Caroline attended a preschool with 10 other children inside the home.

Vaughn Meader's First Family comedy album, which parodied the president, the first lady, their family, and the administration, sold about four million copies.

=== Health ===
Kennedy was plagued by childhood diseases, including whooping cough, chickenpox, measles, and ear infections. These ailments compelled him to spend a considerable amount of time convalescing. Three months prior to his third birthday, in 1920, Kennedy came down with scarlet fever, a highly contagious and life-threatening disease, and was admitted to Boston City Hospital.

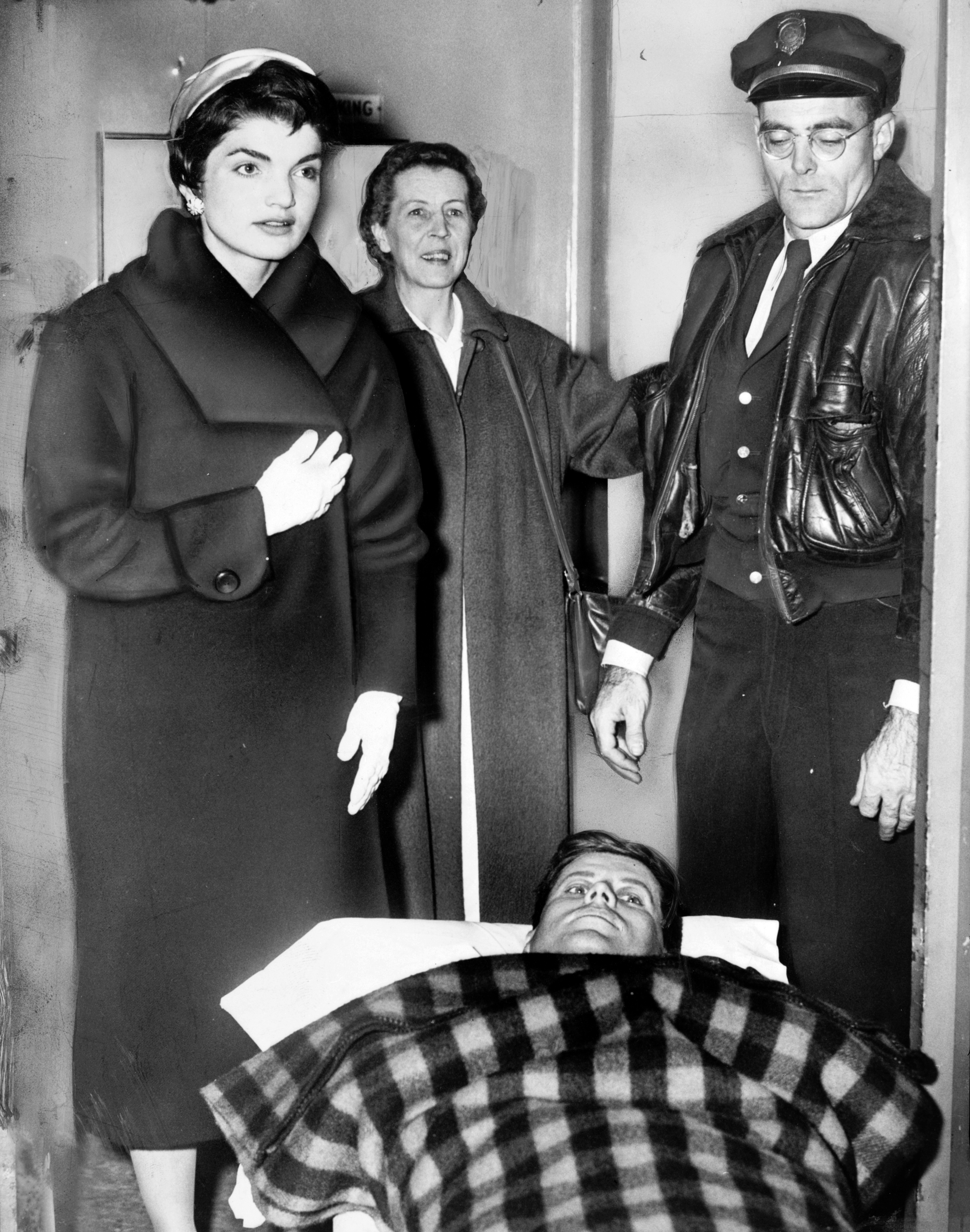
Kennedy and Jackie leaving the hospital following his spinal surgery, December 1954

During his years at Choate, Kennedy was beset by health problems that culminated with his emergency hospitalization in 1934 at Yale New Haven Hospital, where doctors suspected leukemia. While ill, he became a passionate reader and also a fatalist. In June 1934, he was admitted to the Mayo Clinic in Minnesota; the ultimate diagnosis was colitis. After withdrawing from Princeton University, Kennedy was hospitalized for observation at Peter Bent Brigham Hospital in Boston. He then spent the spring of 1936 working as a ranch hand outside Benson, Arizona under Jack Speiden.

Years after Kennedy's death, it was revealed that in September 1947—at age 30 and during his first term in Congress—he was diagnosed by Sir Daniel Davis at The London Clinic with Addison's disease. Davis estimated that Kennedy would not live for another year, while Kennedy hoped he could live for ten. In 1966, White House physician Janet Travell disclosed that Kennedy also had hypothyroidism. The presence of two endocrine diseases raises the possibility that Kennedy had autoimmune polyendocrine syndrome type 2.

Kennedy suffered from chronic severe back pain, for which he underwent surgery. His condition may have had diplomatic repercussions, as he was reportedly taking a combination of medications to manage the pain during the 1961 Vienna Summit. The combination included hormones, animal organ cells, steroids, vitamins, enzymes, and amphetamines, and possible side effects included hyperactivity, hypertension, impaired judgment, nervousness, and mood swings. Kennedy at one time was regularly seen by three doctors, one of whom, Max Jacobson, at first was unknown to the other two, as his mode of treatment was controversial and used for the most severe bouts of back pain.

Into late 1961, disagreements existed among Kennedy's doctors concerning the balance of medication and exercise. Kennedy preferred the former because he was short on time and desired immediate relief. The president's primary White House physician, George G. Burkley, set up gym equipment in the White House basement, where Kennedy performed stretching exercises three times a week. Details of these and other medical issues were not publicly disclosed during Kennedy's lifetime. Burkley realized that treatments by Jacobson and Travell, including excessive use of steroids and amphetamines, were medically inappropriate, and took action to remove Kennedy from their care.

External videos
- Presentation by Robert Dallek on An Unfinished Life: John F. Kennedy, 1917–1963, May 20, 2003, C-SPAN

In 2002, Robert Dallek wrote an extensive history of Kennedy's health based on a collection of Kennedy–associated papers from 1955 to 1963, including X-rays and prescription records from Travell. According to Travell's records, during his presidency, Kennedy suffered from high fevers; stomach, colon, and prostate issues; abscesses; high cholesterol; and adrenal problems. Travell kept a "Medicine Administration Record", cataloging Kennedy's medications:

injected and ingested corticosteroids for his adrenal insufficiency; procaine shots and ultrasound treatments and hot packs for his back; Lomotil, Metamucil, paregoric, phenobarbital, testosterone, and trasentine to control his diarrhea, abdominal discomfort, and weight loss; penicillin and other antibiotics for his urinary-tract infections and an abscess; and Tuinal to help him sleep.

=== Affairs and friendships ===
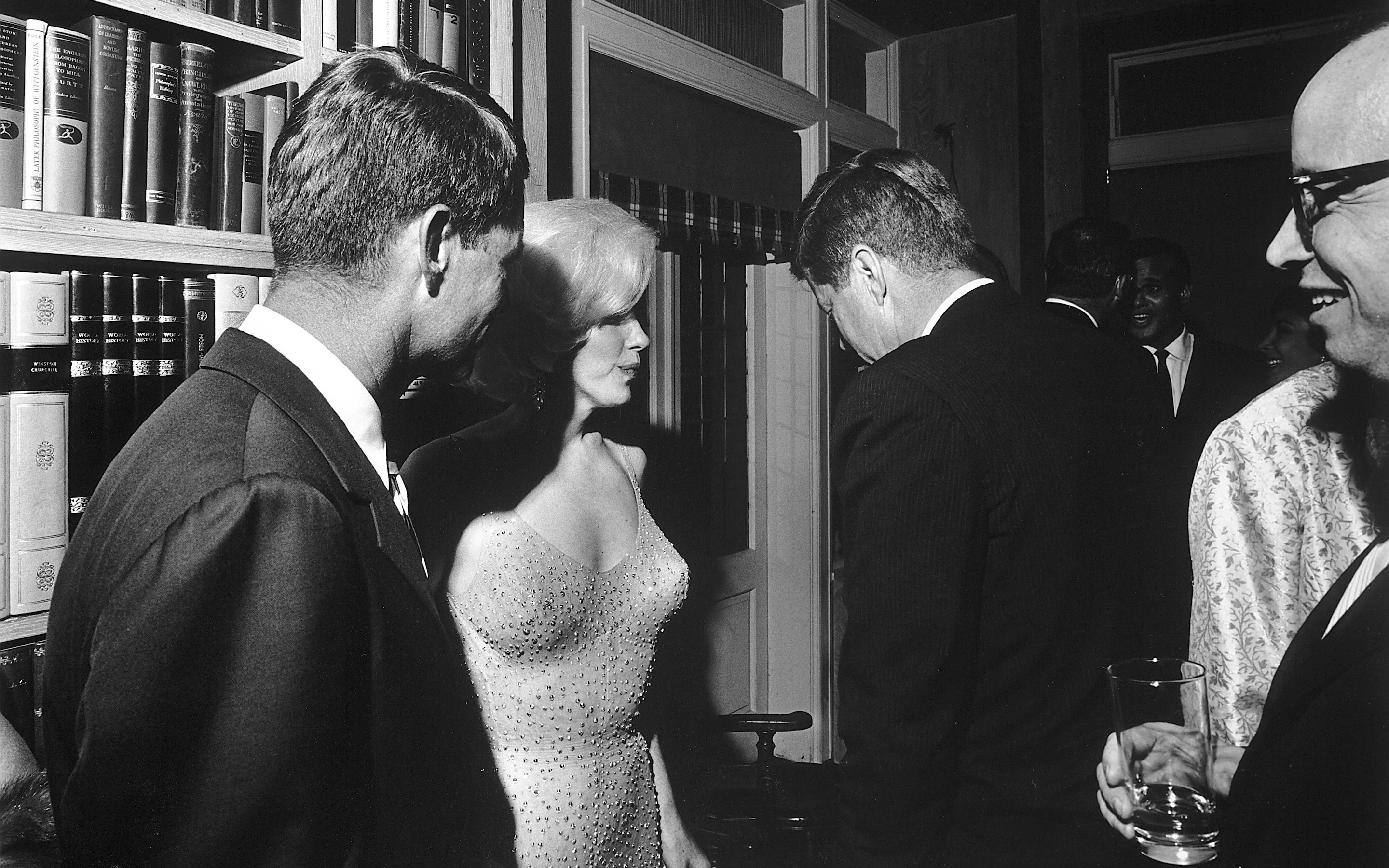
Attorney General Robert F. Kennedy, Marilyn Monroe, and John F. Kennedy talk during the president's May 19, 1962, early birthday party, where Monroe publicly serenaded Kennedy with "Happy Birthday, Mr. President"

Kennedy was single in the 1940s and had relationships with Danish journalist Inga Arvad and actress Gene Tierney. During his time as a senator, he had an affair with Gunilla von Post who later wrote that the future president tried to end his marriage to be with her before he and his wife had any children. Kennedy was also reported to have had affairs with Marilyn Monroe, Judith Campbell, Mary Pinchot Meyer, Marlene Dietrich, White House intern Mimi Alford, and his wife's press secretary, Pamela Turnure. Several conspiracy theories have surrounded Monroe's death, alleging that Kennedy may have been involved.

The full extent of Kennedy's relationship with Monroe—who in 1962 famously sang "Happy Birthday, Mr. President" at Kennedy's birthday celebration at Madison Square Garden—is not known, though it has been reported that they spent a weekend together in March 1962 while he was staying at Bing Crosby's house. Furthermore, people at the White House switchboard noted that Monroe had called Kennedy during 1962. J. Edgar Hoover, the FBI director, received reports about Kennedy's indiscretions. These included an alleged tryst with a suspected East German spy, Ellen Rometsch. According to historian Michael Beschloss, in July 1963, Hoover reportedly informed Robert Kennedy about the affair with a woman "suspected as a Soviet intelligence agent, someone linked to East German intelligence". Robert reportedly took the matter seriously enough to raise it with leading Democratic and Republican figures in Congress. However, the FBI never turned up "any solid evidence" that Rometsch was a spy or that she had a relationship with President Kennedy. Former Secret Service agent Larry Newman recalled "morale problems" that the president's indiscretions engendered within the Secret Service.

Kennedy inspired affection and loyalty from the members of his team and his supporters. According to Reeves, this included "the logistics of Kennedy's liaisons ... [which] required secrecy and devotion rare in the annals of the energetic service demanded by successful politicians." Kennedy believed that his friendly relationship with members of the press would help protect him from public revelations about his sex life.

=== Sports ===
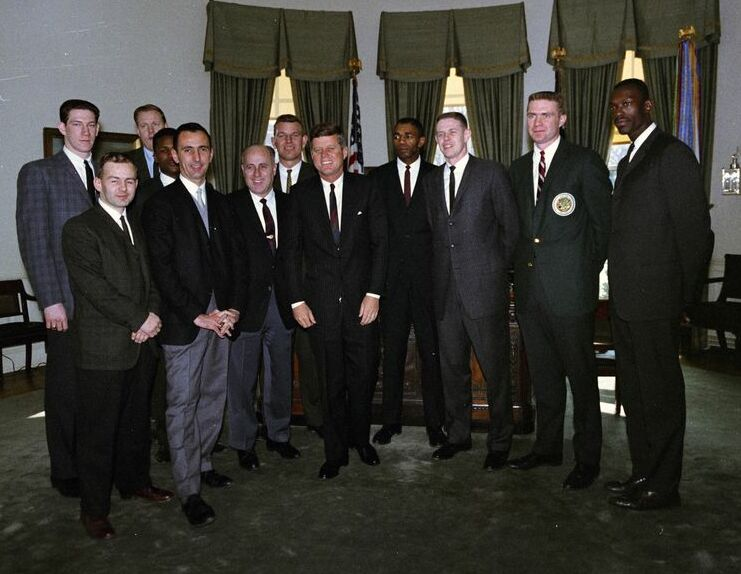
President John F. Kennedy with the Boston Celtics, January 1963

Kennedy was a fan of Major League Baseball's Boston Red Sox and the National Basketball Association's Boston Celtics. Growing up on Cape Cod, Kennedy and his siblings developed a lifelong passion for sailing. He also took up golf; playing regularly at the Hyannisport Club in Massachusetts and the Palm Beach Country Club in Florida.

=== Religion ===
Kennedy was the first Catholic elected to the presidency. During his childhood, he attended St. Aidan's Church in Brookline, Massachusetts, where he was baptized on June 19, 1917. From 1946 until he died in 1963, he served on the advisory board of the Roman Catholic Emmanuel College.

== Historical evaluations and legacy ==
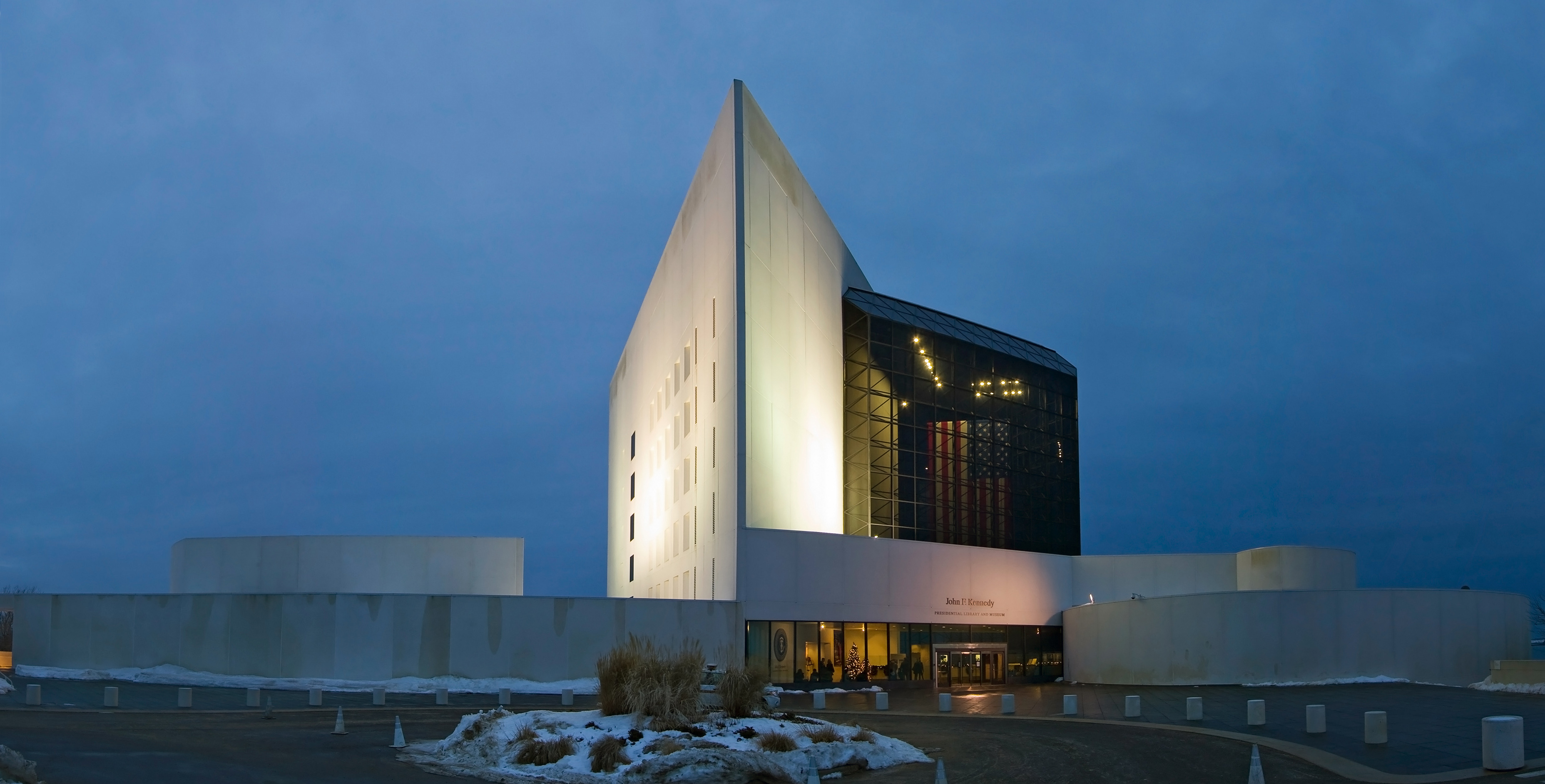
The John F. Kennedy Presidential Library and Museum in Boston

=== Presidency ===
Historians and political scientists tend to rank Kennedy as an above-average president, and he is usually the highest-ranking president who served less than one full term. A 2010 survey by the Gallup Organization, when Americans were asked their opinions of modern presidents, Kennedy was found to be the most popular, with an 85 percent retrospective approval rating. A 2014 survey from The Washington Post of 162 members of the American Political Science Association's presidents and Executive Politics section ranked Kennedy 14th highest overall among the 43 persons who have been president, including then-president Barack Obama. The survey found Kennedy to be the most overrated U.S. president. A 2017 C-SPAN survey has Kennedy ranked among the top ten presidents. A 2023 Gallup survey showed Kennedy with a retrospective approval rating of 90 percent, the highest of all U.S. presidents in recent history. Assessments of his policies are mixed. Many of Kennedy's legislative proposals were passed after his death, during the Johnson administration, and Kennedy's death gave those proposals a powerful moral component.

Kennedy came in third (behind Martin Luther King Jr. and Mother Teresa) in Gallup's List of Widely Admired People of the 20th century. In 1961, he was awarded the Laetare Medal by the University of Notre Dame, considered the most prestigious award for American Catholics. He was posthumously awarded the Pacem in Terris Award (Latin: Peace on Earth) and the Presidential Medal of Freedom.

==== Camelot ====
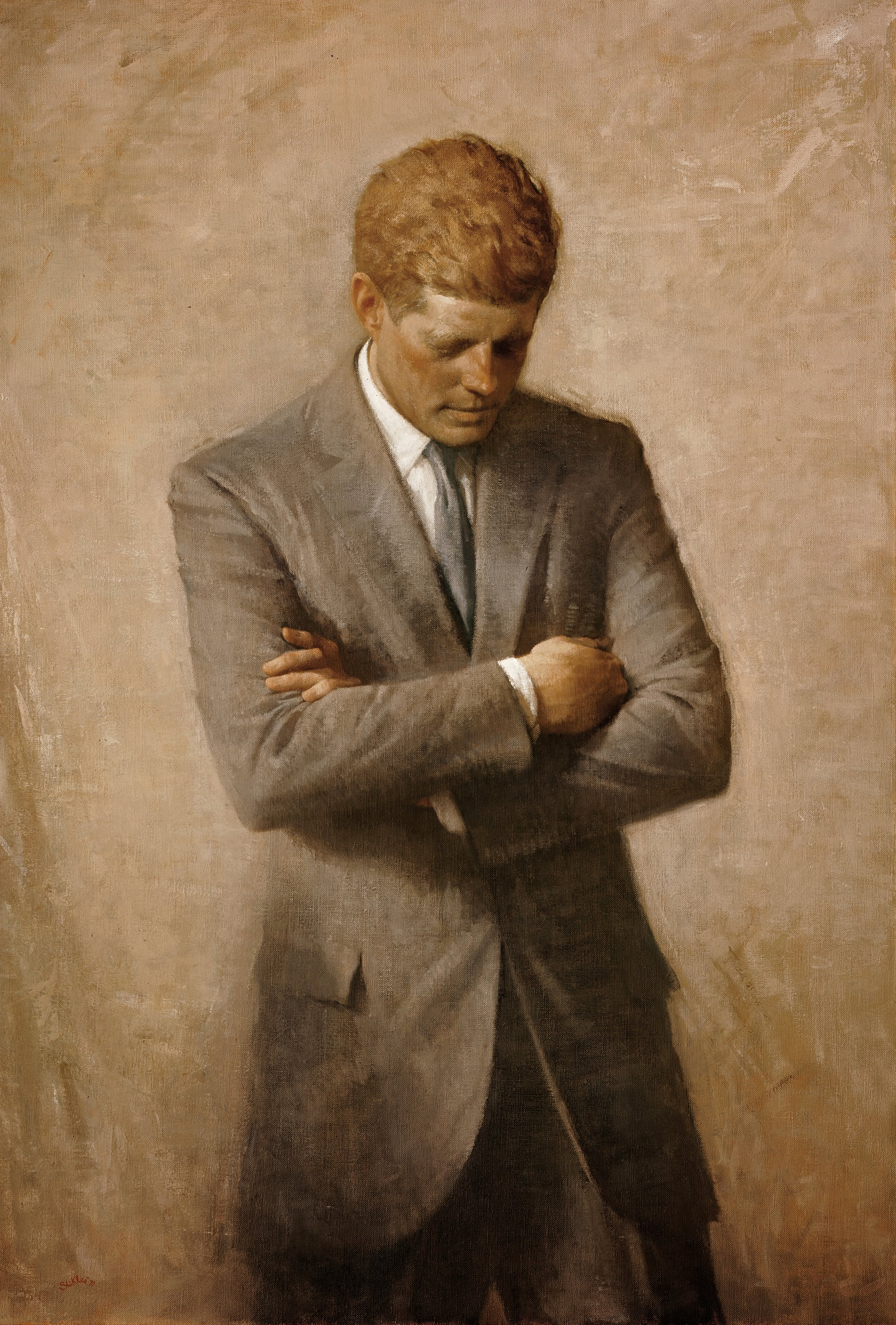
Official White House portrait of Kennedy, by Aaron Shikler

The term "Camelot" is often used to describe his presidency, reflecting both the mythic grandeur accorded Kennedy in death and powerful nostalgia for that era of American history. According to Richard Dean Burns and Joseph M. Siracusa, the most popular theme surrounding Kennedy's legacy is its replay of the legend of King Arthur and Camelot from Arthurian literature. In an interview following Kennedy's death, his widow Jacqueline mentioned his affection for the Broadway musical Camelot and quoted its closing lines: "Don't let it be forgot, that once there was a spot, for one brief, shining moment that was known as Camelot." Critics, especially historians, have dismissed the Camelot myth as a distortion of Kennedy's actions, beliefs, and policies. However, in the public memory, the years of Kennedy's presidency are still seen as a brief, brilliant, and shining moment.

=== Memorials and eponyms ===
Examples of the extensive list include:

- John F. Kennedy Space Center (formerly NASA Launch Operations Center), Merritt Island, Florida – renamed on November 29, 1963
- John F. Kennedy International Airport (formerly Idlewild Airport), Queens, New York City – renamed on December 24, 1963
- USS John F. Kennedy (CV-67) – U.S. Navy aircraft carrier ordered in April 1964, launched in May 1967, and decommissioned in August 2007;
- Kennedy half-dollar – first minted in 1964
- John F. Kennedy School of Government, part of Harvard University – renamed in 1966
- John F. Kennedy Federal Building, Government Center section of Boston, – opened in 1966
- John Fitzgerald Kennedy Memorial, Dallas – opened in 1970
- John F. Kennedy Center for the Performing Arts, Washington, D.C. – named in 1964; opened in 1971
- John F. Kennedy Presidential Library and Museum, Dorchester section of Boston, adjacent to the University of Massachusetts Boston – opened in 1979
- Statue of John F. Kennedy by Isabel McIlvain, on the grounds of the Massachusetts State House, Boston – dedicated on May 29, 1990

== Works ==
=== Books ===
- Kennedy, John F. Why England Slept. W. Funk. ISBN 978-1-44-084990-9.
- Kennedy, John F. Profiles in Courage. Harper & Brothers. ISBN 978-0-06-095544-1.
- Kennedy, John F. A Nation of Immigrants. Anti-Defamation League. ISBN 978-0-06-144754-9.

=== Select speeches ===
Kennedy comments on the possible prevention of the Cold War
President Kennedy comments on the possible prevention of the Cold War

Kennedy's message to Turkey
Kennedy's message to Turkish President Cemal Gursel and The Turkish People on the Anniversary of the Death of Kemal Atatürk, November 10, 1963 (accompanying text)

Announcement to go to the Moon
Announcement by John F. Kennedy to go to the Moon (duration 00:11)

Secret Societies speech
JFK Secret Societies speech

== See also ==
- Cultural depictions of John F. Kennedy
- Electoral history of John F. Kennedy – List of elections featuring John F. Kennedy as a candidate
- History of the United States (1945–1964)
- Kennedy Doctrine – U.S. foreign policy doctrine
- Lincoln–Kennedy coincidences urban legend – Urban legend about two U.S. presidents
- List of heads of state and government who were assassinated or executed
- List of presidents of the United States
- List of presidents of the United States by previous experience
- List of United States presidential assassination attempts and plots
- Presidential transition of John F. Kennedy – Transfer of presidential power from Dwight D. Eisenhower to John F. Kennedy
- Presidents of the United States on U.S. postage stamps
- "Senator, you're no Jack Kennedy" – Vice Presidential debate retort by Senator Lloyd Bentsen, 1988

== Notes ==
U.S. House of Representatives
Preceded by James Michael Curley	Member of the U.S. House of Representatives from Massachusetts's 11th congressional district 1947–1953	Succeeded by Tip O'Neill
Party political offices
Preceded by David I. Walsh	Democratic nominee for U.S. Senator from Massachusetts (Class 1); 1952, 1958	Succeeded by Ted Kennedy
Preceded by Adlai Stevenson II	Democratic nominee for President of the United States; 1960	Succeeded by Lyndon B. Johnson
U.S. Senate
Preceded by Henry Cabot Lodge Jr.	United States Senator (Class 1) from Massachusetts; 1953–1960; Served alongside: Leverett Saltonstall	Succeeded by Benjamin A. Smith II
Political offices
Preceded by Dwight D. Eisenhower	President of the United States; 1961–1963	Succeeded by Lyndon B. Johnson
Honorary titles
Preceded by Unknown Soldiers of World War II and the Korean War	Persons who have lain in state or honor in the United States Capitol rotunda 1963	Succeeded by Douglas MacArthur
