= Bibliography of John F. Kennedy =

This bibliography of John F. Kennedy is a list of published works about John F. Kennedy, the 35th president of the United States.

== Biographical and politics ==
- Ballard, Robert D. (2002). Collision with History: The Search for John F. Kennedy's PT 109. Washington, DC: National Geographic. ISBN 978-0-7922-6876-5.
- Bernstein, Irving. Promises kept: John F. Kennedy's New Frontier (Oxford University Press, 1993) online.
- Bishop, Jim (1964). A Day In The Life of President Kennedy. New York: Random House.
- Blight, James G.; Lang, Janet M. (2005). The Fog of War: Eleven Lessons from the Life of Robert S. McNamara. Lanham, Md.: Rowman & Littlefield. ISBN 978-0-7425-4221-1.
- Brauer, Carl. J (1977). John F. Kennedy and the Second Reconstruction. Columbia University Press. ISBN 9780231083676.
- Brauer, Carl M. (2002). "John F. Kennedy". In Graff, Henry (ed.). The Presidents: A Reference History (7th ed.). pp. 481–498. ISBN 0-684-80551-0.
- Brinkley, Alan (2012). John F. Kennedy. Times Books. ISBN 978-0-8050-8349-1.
- Bugliosi, Vincent (2007). Reclaiming History: The Assassination of President John F. Kennedy. New York: Norton. ISBN 978-0-393-04525-3.
- Burner, David (1988). John F. Kennedy and a New Generation. Pearson Longman. ISBN 9780205603459.
- Casey, Shaun (2009). The Making of a Catholic President: Kennedy vs. Nixon 1960.
- Clarke, Thurston (2013). JFK's Last Hundred Days. Penguin Press HC. ISBN 978-1-594-20425-8.
- Cohen, Andrew (2016) [2014]. Two Days in June: John F. Kennedy and the 48 Hours That Changed History. Oxford, England: Signal. ISBN 978-0771023897.
- Collier, Peter & Horowitz, David (1984). The Kennedys.
- Cottrell, John (1964). Assassination! The World Stood Still.
- Dallek, Robert (2003). An Unfinished Life: John F. Kennedy, 1917–1963. Boston, MA: Little, Brown and Co. ISBN 978-0-316-17238-7.
- Donovan, Robert J. (2001) [1961]. PT-109: John F. Kennedy in WW II (40th Anniversary ed.). McGraw Hill. ISBN 978-0-07-137643-3.
- Douglass, James W. (2008). JFK and the Unspeakable: Why He Died and Why It Matters. Maryknoll, N.Y.: Orbis Books. ISBN 978-1-57075-755-6.
- Doyle, William (2015). PT-109: An American Epic of War, Survival, and the Destiny of John F. Kennedy. New York City: Harper-Collins. ISBN 978-0-06-234658-2.
- Dudley, Robert L.; Shiraev, Eric (2008). Counting Every Vote: The Most Contentious Elections in American History. Dulles, Virginia: Potomac Books. ISBN 978-1-59797-224-6.
- Daynes, Byron W. and Glen Sussman (2010). White House Politics and the Environment: Franklin D. Roosevelt to George W. Bush. Texas A&M University Press. pp. 46–56 on Kennedy.
- Fay, Paul B., Jr. (1966). The Pleasure of His Company.
- Giglio, James (1991). The Presidency of John F. Kennedy.
- Goduti, Philip A. Jr. (2012). Robert F. Kennedy and the Shaping of Civil Rights, 1960-1964. McFarland. ISBN 9781476600871.
- Hamilton, Nigel (1992). JFK: Reckless Youth.
- Harper, Paul, and Krieg, Joann P. eds. (1988). John F. Kennedy: The Promise Revisited.
- Harris, Seymour E. (1962). The Economics of the Political Parties, with Special Attention to Presidents Eisenhower and Kennedy.
- Heath, Jim F. (1976). Decade of Disillusionment: The Kennedy–Johnson Years.
- Hersh, Seymour (1997). The Dark Side of Camelot.
- Herst, Burton (2007). Bobby and J. Edgar: The Historic Face-Off Between the Kennedys and J. Edgar Hoover That Transformed America. Basic Books. ISBN 978-0-7867-1982-2.
- Hodgson, Godfrey (2015). JFK and LBJ: The Last Two Great Presidents. Yale UP. Excerpt.
- Kenney, Charles (2000). John F. Kennedy: The Presidential Portfolio. PublicAffairs. ISBN 978-1-891620-36-2.
- Lacroix, Patrick (2021). John F. Kennedy and the Politics of Faith. Lawrence: University Press of Kansas.
- Leaming, Barbara (2006). Jack Kennedy: The Education of a Statesman. W. W. Norton. ISBN 978-0-393051-61-2.
- Logevall, Fredrik (2020). JFK: Coming of Age in the American Century, 1917–1956. Random House. ISBN 978-0812997132.
- Maier, Thomas (2004). The Kennedys: America's Emerald Kings. ISBN 9780465043187.
- Manchester, William (1967). The Death of a President: November 20–25, 1963. New York: Harper & Row. LCCN 67010496.
- Manchester, William (1962, 1967). Portrait of a President. John F. Kennedy in profile.
- Matthews, Chris (2011). Jack Kennedy: Elusive Hero. Simon & Schuster. ISBN 978-1-4516-3508-9.
- Parmet, Herbert (1980). Jack: The Struggles of John F. Kennedy.
- Parmet, Herbert (1983). JFK: The Presidency of John F. Kennedy.
- Parmet, Herbert (1997). "The Kennedy Myth". Gerster, Patrick, and Cords, Nicholas, eds. In Myth America: A Historical Anthology, Volume II.
- Piper, Michael Collins (2004). Final Judgment, 6th edition. American Free Press.
- O'Brien, Michael (2005). John F. Kennedy: A Biography. Thomas Dunne. ISBN 978-0-312-28129-8.
- Reeves, Richard (1993). President Kennedy: Profile of Power. New York: Simon & Schuster. ISBN 978-0-671-64879-4.
- Reeves, Thomas. A Question of Character: A Life of John F. Kennedy (1991); hostile biography
- Sabato, Larry J. (2013). The Kennedy Half-Century: The Lasting Legacy of John F. Kennedy forthcoming
- Schlesinger, Arthur M. Jr. (2002) [1965]. A Thousand Days: John F. Kennedy in the White House. Mariner Books. ISBN 978-0-618-21927-8.
- Schlesinger, Arthur M. Jr. (2002) [1978]. Robert Kennedy And His Times. Mariner Books. ISBN 978-0618219285.
- Selverstone, Marc J., ed. (2014). A Companion to John F. Kennedy. Wiley-Blackwell.
- Sorensen, Theodore (1966) [1965]. Kennedy (paperback). New York: Bantam. OCLC 2746832.
- Taraborrelli, J. Randy (2025). JFK: Public, Private, Secret (1st hardcover ed.). New York: St. Martin's Press. ISBN 9781250346384. OCLC 1522761868.
- Walton, Hanes Jr.; Smith, Robert C. (2000). American Politics and the African American Quest for Universal Freedom. Addison, Wesley, Longman. ISBN 0-321-07038-0.
- Whalen, Thomas J. (2014). JFK and His Enemies: A Portrait of Power.

== Foreign policy ==
- Andrew, Christopher (1995). For the President's Eyes Only: Secret Intelligence and the American Presidency from Washington to Bush. pp. 257–306.
- Angelo, Anne-Marie, and Tom Adam Davies. "'American Business can Assist [African] Hands:' The Kennedy Administration, U.S. Corporations, and the Cold War Struggle for Africa." The Sixties 8.2 (2015): 156-178.
- Bass, Warren (2003). Support Any Friend: Kennedy's Middle East and the Making of the U.S.-Israel Alliance. New York: Oxford University Press. ISBN 0195165802.
- Beschloss, Michael R. The Crisis Years: Kennedy and Khrushchev, 1960-1963 (1991)
- Brinkley, Douglas, and Richard T. Griffiths, eds. John F. Kennedy and Europe (1999) essays by experts.
- Busch, Peter. All the Way With JFK? Britain, the US, and the Vietnam War (2003).
- Colman, Jonathan (2015). "The 'Bowl of Jelly': The U.S. Department of State during the Kennedy and Johnson Years, 1961-1968." Hague Journal of Diplomacy, vol. 10, no. 2, pp. 172–196.
- Cull, Nicholas J. "'The Man Who Invented Truth': The Tenure of Edward R. Murrow as Director of the United States Information Agency During the Kennedy Years." Cold War History 4.1 (2003): 23-48.
- David, Andrew, and Michael Holm. "The Kennedy Administration and the Battle Over Foreign Aid: The Untold Story of the Clay Committee." Diplomacy & Statecraft, vol. 27, no. 1 (2016): 65-92.
- Dean, Robert D. "Masculinity as ideology: John F. Kennedy and the domestic politics of foreign policy." Diplomatic History 22.1 (1998): 29-62.
- Dunne, Michael. "Kennedy's Alliance for Progress: Countering Revolution in Latin America, Part II: The Historiographical Record." International Affairs, vol. 92, no. 2 (2016): 435-452.
- Field, Thomas C. From Development to Dictatorship: Bolivia and the Alliance for Progress in the Kennedy Era (2014)
- Freedman, Lawrence. Kennedy's Wars: Berlin, Cuba, Laos and Vietnam (2000)
- Fursenko, Aleksandr and Timothy Naftali. One Hell of a Gamble: Khrushchev, Castro and Kennedy, 1958–1964 (1997)
- Gavin, Francis J. Gold, Dollars, and Power: The Politics of International Monetary Relations, 1958-1971 (2007)
- Gioe, David, and Len Scott, Christopher Andrew, eds. An International History of the Cuban Missile Crisis (2014), essays by scholars.
- Giglio, James N. The Presidency of John F. Kennedy (2006).
- Gleijeses, Piero. "Ships in the Night: The CIA, the White House and the Bay of Pigs." Journal of Latin American Studies (1995) 27#1 1–42
- Hilsman, Roger. To Move a Nation: The Politics of Foreign Policy in the Administration of John F. Kennedy (1967).
- Hurley, Christopher John. The Imperial Imperative: John F Kennedy and US Foreign Relations. (Master of Research (MRes) thesis, University of Kent, 2018) online
- Hybel, A. US Foreign Policy Decision-making from Truman to Kennedy: Responses to International Challenges (Springer, 2016).
- Jones, Howard. The Bay of Pigs (2008)
- Jones, Howard. The Lost Chance for Peace and the Escalation of War in Vietnam (2003)
- Kaufman, Burton I. "John F. Kennedy as world leader: A perspective on the literature." Diplomatic History 17.3 (1993): 447-470.
- Kempe, Frederick. Berlin 1961: Kennedy, Khrushchev, and the most dangerous place on earth (2011).
- Kunz, Diane B. The Diplomacy of the Crucial Decade: American Foreign Relations during the 1960s (1994)
- Logevall, Fredrik, The Lost Chance for Peace and the Escalation of War in Vietnam (1999).
- Lynch, Grayston L. Decision for Disaster Betrayal at the Bay of Pigs (2000)
- McKercher, Asa. Camelot and Canada: Canadian-American Relations in the Kennedy Era (Oxford UP, 2016).
- Muehlenbeck, Philip Emil. Betting on the Africans: John F. Kennedy's courting of African nationalist leaders (Oxford University Press, 2012).
- Newman, John M. JFK and Vietnam: Deception, Intrigue, and the Struggle for Power (1992)
- Newmann, William W. "Searching for the Right Balance? Managing Foreign Policy Decisions under Eisenhower and Kennedy." Congress & the Presidency 42#2 (2015).
- O'Brien, Michael. John F. Kennedy: A Biography (2005).
- Pelz, Stephen E. "“When Do I Have Time to Think?” John F. Kennedy, Roger Hilsman, and the Laotian Crisis of 1962." Diplomatic History 3.2 (1979): 215-230.
- Paterson, Thomas G., ed. Kennedy's Quest for Victory: American Foreign Policy, 1961-1963 (1989).
- Powaski, Ronald E. "John F. Kennedy, the Hawks, the Doves, and the Cuban Missile Crisis, 1962." in American Presidential Statecraft (2017) pp. 11–65.
- Rabe, Stephen G. The Most Dangerous Area in the World: John F. Kennedy Confronts Communist Revolution in Latin America (1999).
- Rakove, Robert B. Kennedy, Johnson and the Nonaligned World (2013)
- Riedel, Bruce. JFK's Forgotten Crisis: Tibet, the CIA, and the Sino-Indian War (2015).
- Rizas, Sotiris. "Formulating a policy towards Eastern Europe on the eve of Détente: The USA, the Allies and Bridge Building, 1961–1964." Journal of Transatlantic Studies 12.1 (2014): 18-40.
- Schaffer, Howard B. Chester Bowles: New Dealer in the Cold War (1993)
- Schlesinger, Arthur M. Jr A Thousand Days: John F. Kennedy in the White House (1965)
- Schoenbaum, Thomas J. Waging Peace and War: Dean Rusk in the Truman, Kennedy and Johnson Years (1988)
- Selverstone, Marc J. "Eternal Flaming: The Historiography of Kennedy Foreign Policy." Passport: The Newsletter of the SHAFR, vol. 46, no. 1 (April 2015), pp 22–29.
- Selverstone, Marc J., ed. A Companion to John F. Kennedy (2014). Emphasis on historiography.
- Sergunin, Alexander. "John F. Kennedy’s Decision-Making on the Berlin Crisis of 1961." Review of History and Political Science, vol. 2, no. 1 (2014): 1-27. online Archived February 20, 2019, at the Wayback Machine
- Shields, David. Kennedy and Macmillan: Cold War Politics (2006) excerpt
- Shapley, Deborah. Promise and Power: The Life and Times of Robert McNamara (1993)
- Simpson, Bradley. Economists with Guns: Authoritarian Development and U.S.-Indonesian Relations 1960-1968 (2008)
- Taffet, Jeffrey J. Foreign Aid as Foreign Policy: The Alliance for Progress in Latin America (2007)
- Tucker, Spencer. The Encyclopedia of the Vietnam War: A Political, Social, and Military History (1998)
- Walton, Richard J. Cold War and Counterrevolution: The Foreign Policy of John F. Kennedy (1972).
- Wenger, Andreas, and Marcel Gerber (June 1999). "John F. Kennedy and the Limited Test Ban Treaty: A Case Study of Presidential Leadership". Presidential Studies Quarterly, vol. 29, no. 2: 460-487. JSTOR 27551999.

=== Historiography and memory ===
- Abramson, Jill (October 22, 2013). "Kennedy, the Elusive President". The New York Times Book Review.

Notes that thus far about 40,000 books have been published about JFK.

- Brandimarte, Cynthia A. "Review: The Sixth Floor: John F. Kennedy and the Memory of a Nation," Journal of American History 78#1 (1991), pp. 268–274. JSTOR /2078102
- Craig, Campbell. "Kennedy's International Legacy, Fifty Years On". International Affairs, vol. 89, no. 6 (2013): 1367-1378. JSTOR 24538446.
- Eder, Elizabeth. "Memory of a Nation: Effectively Using Artworks to Teach about the Assassination of President John F. Kennedy". Social Education (November/December 2011), pp. 296–300.
- George, Alice. The assassination of John F. Kennedy: political trauma and American memory (Routledge, 2012).
- Gunzenhäuser, Randi. "History, and the Assassination of John F. Kennedy" Amerikastudien/ American Studies 43#1 (1998), pp. 75–91. JSTOR 41157352.
- Hellmann, John (1997). The Kennedy Obsession: The American Myth of JFK. ISBN 978-0231107983.
- Kazin, Michael (December 2017). "An Idol and Once a President: John F. Kennedy at 100." Journal of American History, 104#3 pp. 707–726. doi:10.1093/jahist/jax315. ISSN 0021-8723.}.
- Kitch, Carolyn. " 'A death in the American family': Myth, memory, and national values in the media mourning of John F. Kennedy Jr." Journalism & Mass Communication Quarterly 79.2 (2002): 294-309.
- Knott, Stephen F. Coming to Terms with John F. Kennedy (2022) excerpt
- Santa Cruz, Paul H. Making JFK Matter: Popular Memory and the 35th President. Denton: University of North Texas Press (2015).
- Selverstone, Marc J., ed. A Companion to John F. Kennedy. Wiley-Blackwell (2014). ISBN 978-1444350364. Topical essays by scholars focusing on historiography.
- Ulyatt, Michelle (2014). "The John F. Kennedy Presidential Library and Museum as a Cultural Representation of the Public Memory of the President". European Journal of American Culture. 33#2, pp. 117–130. doi:10.1386/ejac.33.2.117_1.
- Ward, John William (1969). Red, White, and Blue: Men, Books, and Ideas in American Culture . New York: Oxford University Press.

== Primary sources ==
- Alford, Mimi; Newman, Judith (2011). Once Upon A Secret: My Affair with President John F. Kennedy and its Aftermath. London: Hutchinson. ISBN 978-0-09-193175-9.
- Goldzwig, Steven R. and Dionisopoulos, George N., eds. In a Perilous Hour: The Public Address of John F. Kennedy (1995)
- Kennedy, Jacqueline. Jacqueline Kennedy: Historic Conversations on Life with John F. Kennedy (2011). Hyperion Books. ISBN 1401324258.
- McNamara, Robert S. (2000). Argument Without End: In Search of Answers to the Vietnam Tragedy.
- McNamara, Robert. In retrospect: The tragedy and lessons of Vietnam (2017).
