= Johnny I Hardly Knew Ye =

English popular traditional song

- Folk song Anti-war song Parody song
- Other name: "Johnny We Hardly Knew Ye" "Johnny I Hardly Knew Ya"
- Catalogue: Roud Folk Song Index 3137
- Language: English
- Based on: "When Johnny Comes Marching Home"
- Published: 1867
- Publisher: Joseph B. Geoghegan

"Johnny I Hardly Knew Ye" (Roud 3137), also known as "Johnny We Hardly Knew Ye" or "Johnny I Hardly Knew Ya", is a popular traditional song, sung to the same tune as "When Johnny Comes Marching Home". First published in London in 1867 and written by Joseph B. Geoghegan, a prolific English songwriter and successful music hall figure, it remained popular in Britain and Ireland and the United States into the early years of the 20th century. The song was recorded by The Clancy Brothers & Tommy Makem on their eponymous album in 1961, leading to a renewal of its popularity.

Originally seen as humorous, the song today is considered a powerful anti-war song. Except for an initial framing stanza, the song is a monologue by an Irish woman who meets her former lover on the road to Athy, which is located in County Kildare, Ireland. After their illegitimate child was born, the lover ran away and became a soldier. He was badly disfigured, losing his legs, his arms, his eyes and, in some versions, his nose, in fighting on the island of "Sulloon", or Ceylon (now known as Sri Lanka), and will have to be put in (or, in some versions, with) a bowl to beg. In spite of all this, the woman says, she is happy to see him and will keep him on as her lover. Modern versions often end with an anti-war affirmation.

The song has often been supposed to be an anti-recruiting song and to have been written in Ireland in the late 18th or early 19th century, at the time of or in response to the Kandyan Wars, which were fought in Sri Lanka between 1795 and 1818. It has also been widely speculated that "When Johnny Comes Marching Home", which in actuality was published in 1863, four years earlier than "Johnny I Hardly Knew Ye", was a rewrite of "Johnny I Hardly Knew Ye" to make it more pro-war. However, a recent study by Jonathan Lighter, Lecturer in English at the University of Tennessee and editor of the Historical Dictionary of American Slang, has shown that these suppositions are incorrect since "Johnny I Hardly Knew Ye" originally had a different melody and was later updated using the melody of "When Johnny Comes Marching Home" meaning musically "Johnny I Hardly Knew Ye" was the copy, not the original version. Early newspaper accounts describe the song in the context of its relationship to "When Johnny Comes Marching Home," suggesting it was a parody of the earlier song which was already well known.

== Variations ==
- The repeating chorus line "With your drums and guns and drums and guns" is sometimes sung as "With your drums and guns and guns and drums", or "We had guns and drums and drums and guns", as in the Dropkick Murphys version.
- "Why did ye run from me and the child?" sometimes replaces "Why did ye skedaddle from me and the child?"
- "Where are the legs with which you run?" sometimes replaces "Where are the legs that used to run?", often also accompanied by a change from "When you went to carry a gun" to "When first you went to carry a gun", such as in the version performed by The Clancy Brothers.
- In some versions, the final lines are sung as:

They're rolling out the guns again, hurroo, hurroo
They're rolling out the guns again, hurroo, hurroo
They're rolling out the guns again
But they won't take back our sons again
No they'll never take back our sons again
Johnny, I'm swearing to ye.

- Steeleye Span recorded an adaptation of the song, called "Fighting For Strangers", on their 1976 album Rocket Cottage. Their version is substantially different, but bears the refrain "Johnny, what've they done to you" or "Johnny what'll happen to you". The other similarity is in the last verse:

You haven't an arm, you haven't a leg
The enemy nearly slew you
You'll have to go out on the streets to beg
Oh, poor Johnny, what've they done to you?

- The song "English Civil War" from The Clash's 1978 album Give 'Em Enough Rope incorporates melody and lyrics from the original.
- The rugby song "I Met a Whore in the Park" goes to the tune of the song.
- PJ Harvey's 2011 song "Let England Shake" modifies and incorporates the line, "Indeed your dancing days are done".
- The villains in the 2001 film The Luck of the Irish sang the song during a victory feast.
- The song "Hip Hurray" on the Fiddler's Green's 1995 album King Shepherd retains some of the lyrics while using a different melody and additional lyrics to create a reflection on the original song.
- Marc Gunn and Jamie Haeuser recorded it on their album How America Saved Irish Music (2014).

== Reusage of the title ==
- Johnny We Hardly Knew Ye: A book by Kenneth O'Donnell and David Powers about the truncated presidency of John F. Kennedy published in 1972.
- Daddy, We Hardly Knew You: Germaine Greer, London, 1989
- Johnny, I Hardly Knew You: Edna O'Brien, London, 1977

== Select recordings ==
You can help by expanding this section

- 1959 – Tommy Makem – The Newport Folk Festival, Vol. 1
- 1960 – Bud & Travis – ...In Concert
- 1961 – The Clancy Brothers and Tommy Makem
- 1961 – The Chad Mitchell Trio (blended with "When Johnny Comes Marching Home Again")
- 1961 – Maureen O'Hara
- 1963 – Anita Carter
- 1965 – The Leprechauns... "14 Irish Folk Songs"
- 1969 – Frida Boccara – Un jour, un enfant
  Here the song is called "Johnny jambe de bois" and is sung in French as the twelfth song on thirteen.
- 1972 – Unknown – To Lord Byron
  The song is the anthem of a Greek university student partisan unit named Lord Byron that fought in the lines of the Greek People's Liberation Army ELAS during Dekemvriana. The song was written during Dekemvriana and was recorded at 1972 with other Greek partisans songs and shares the same melody with "Johnny I Hardly Knew Ye".
- 1977 – Ryan's Fancy – Brand New Songs
- 1982 – Susan Dunn – Recital with Pianoforte
- 1986 – Benjamin Luxon (vocals) and Bill Crofut (Banjo) on "Folksongs at Tanglewood" – Omega Records OCD3003
- 1986 – Easterhouse – Contenders – "Johnny I Hardly Knew You"
- 1989 – Hamish Imlach – Portrait LP – "Johhny, I Hardly Knew Ye"
- 1991 – Guns N' Roses – Civil War Axl Rose whistles a part of the melody on the beginning of the song.
- 1994 – Vlad Tepes – "Wladimir's March" instrumental intro track, a version of this song
- 1993 – Joan Baez – Rare, Live & Classic
  Folk singer Joan Baez often included the song in her concert sets during the early to mid-1970s as a statement against the Vietnam War and all wars in general.
- 1994 – The Cranberries, in "Zombie", sing "With their tanks and their bombs, and their bombs, and their guns" – a reference to the chorus of this song.
- 2001 – The Tossers – Communication & Conviction: Last Seven Years
  The Tossers recorded a version of this song in the 90s, and it was later included on the compilation Communication & Conviction: Last Seven Years, which includes everything they have done before 2000. They recorded another live version on 17 March 2008. It was included on their live album Gloatin' and Showboatin': Live on St. Patrick's Day.
- 2002 – Isla St Clair – on the album Amazing Grace – anthems to inspire
- 2002 – Faye Ringel – on the album Hot Chestnuts
- 2002 – Glenn Yarbrough – on the album Here We Go Baby!
- 2003 – The Irish Rovers – on the album Live in Concert
- 2006 – The tune of "Johnny I Hardly Knew Ye" can be heard in the 5th episode of 18th season in "The Simpsons"
- 2007 – Dropkick Murphys – The Meanest of Times
  This version was later selected as a downloadable song for Guitar Hero III: Legends of Rock on 13 March 2008. The song was also featured in an episode of the Sons of Anarchy TV series; a 2009 performance appeared on their Live on Lansdowne, Boston MA live album.
- 2008 – Karan Casey – Ships in the Forest
- 2008 – Tracy Smith – Taverns and Tall Ships
- 2009 – Janis Ian – Essential Janis Ian (recorded earlier)
- 2009 – Susan McKeown and Lorin Sklamberg – Saints & Tzadiks – "Prayer for the Dead"
- 2011 – duYun – Shark in You
- 2012 – Foreign Feathers perform a version on It Could Be Worse.
- 2012 – Vintage Wine – Drums and Guns
- 2013 – Patty Duke – Patty Duke Sings Folk Songs – Time to Move On
- 2013 – Santiano – Mit Den Gezeiten
- 2013 – Marisa Anderson – Traditional and Public Domain Songs
- 2014 – Gormacha – Libation
- 2016 – The McMiners – Country Cross
- 2017 – Ferocious Dog – The Red Album
- 2017 – Teufelstanz – Camera Obscura
- 2019 – The Bolokos – The Bolokos (hidden track)
- 2024 – Flatline Rockers – Six Feet Down – published a faster psychobilly version of this traditional song

== See also ==
- List of anti-war songs
- When Johnny Comes Marching Home
