= Johnny We Hardly Knew Ye =

Johnny, We Hardly Knew Ye or Johnny, I Hardly Knew Ye may refer to:

- Johnny I Hardly Knew Ye, traditional song
- Johnny We Hardly Knew Ye (book), 1972 memoir about John F. Kennedy

== See also ==
- Assassination of John F. Kennedy
