= David Powers =

American government official (1912–1998)

Dave Powers
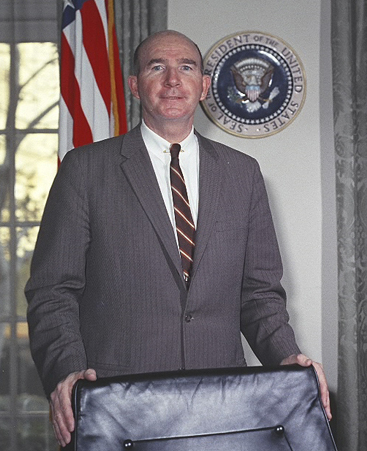

Special Assistant to the President
- In office January 20, 1961 – November 22, 1963
- President: John F. Kennedy
- Preceded by: C. D. Jackson
- Succeeded by: Jack Valenti

Personal details
- Born: David Francis Powers; April 25, 1912 Boston, Massachusetts, U.S.
- Died: March 28, 1998 (aged 85) Arlington, Massachusetts, U.S.
- Party: Democratic
- Spouse: Josephine Lynch (m. 1952)
- Children: 3
- Education: Charlestown High School
- Occupation: Special Assistant to President Kennedy; First curator of the JFK Library and Museum

Military service
- Allegiance: United States
- Branch/service: U.S. Army Air Forces
- Years of service: 1942–1945
- Rank: Master Sergeant
- Unit: Fourteenth Air Force
- Battles/wars: World War II: China-Burma-India Theater

David Francis Powers (April 25, 1912 – March 28, 1998) was Special Assistant and assistant Appointments Secretary to U.S. president John F. Kennedy. Powers served as Museum Curator of the John F. Kennedy Library and Museum from 1964 until his retirement in May 1994. Powers was a military veteran who served in the U.S. Army Air Corps during World War II from 1942 to 1945. Powers was also a close friend of Kennedy.

== Life and career ==
The son of Irish immigrants, Powers was born and raised in the Charlestown section of Boston. His father died when he was two years old. Starting at the age of ten, Powers sold newspapers at the Charlestown Navy Yard to help support his mother and siblings. He graduated from Charlestown High School in 1930, and worked in a Boston publishing business until 1941. He would also take evening courses at Boston College, Harvard College, and the Boston Institute. During the Second World War, Powers served as a master sergeant in the Fourteenth Air Force in the China-Burma-India Theater. A Roman Catholic, he was chief usher at St. Catherine of Sienna Church in Charlestown.

Powers first met Kennedy in 1946, when Kennedy was a Democratic candidate for the Massachusetts Eleventh Congressional District. Kennedy had heard that Powers had an understanding of the people and issues in the district that would be vital to helping him win the race. Although Powers was initially skeptical at how "a millionaire's son from Harvard" could appeal to the working-class voters in the district, he joined Kennedy's campaign after being impressed by a heartfelt speech Kennedy gave to Gold Star mothers who had lost sons in World War II. After Kennedy was elected to Congress, Powers "was at Kennedy's side at every step towards the White House." Powers provided Kennedy with a kind of refuge from the burdens of the "political grind" of running for and serving in office. Powers had a "quick wit and easy regard for rogue politicians that endeared him to Kennedy...[he] enjoyed Powers's mischievous sense of humor."

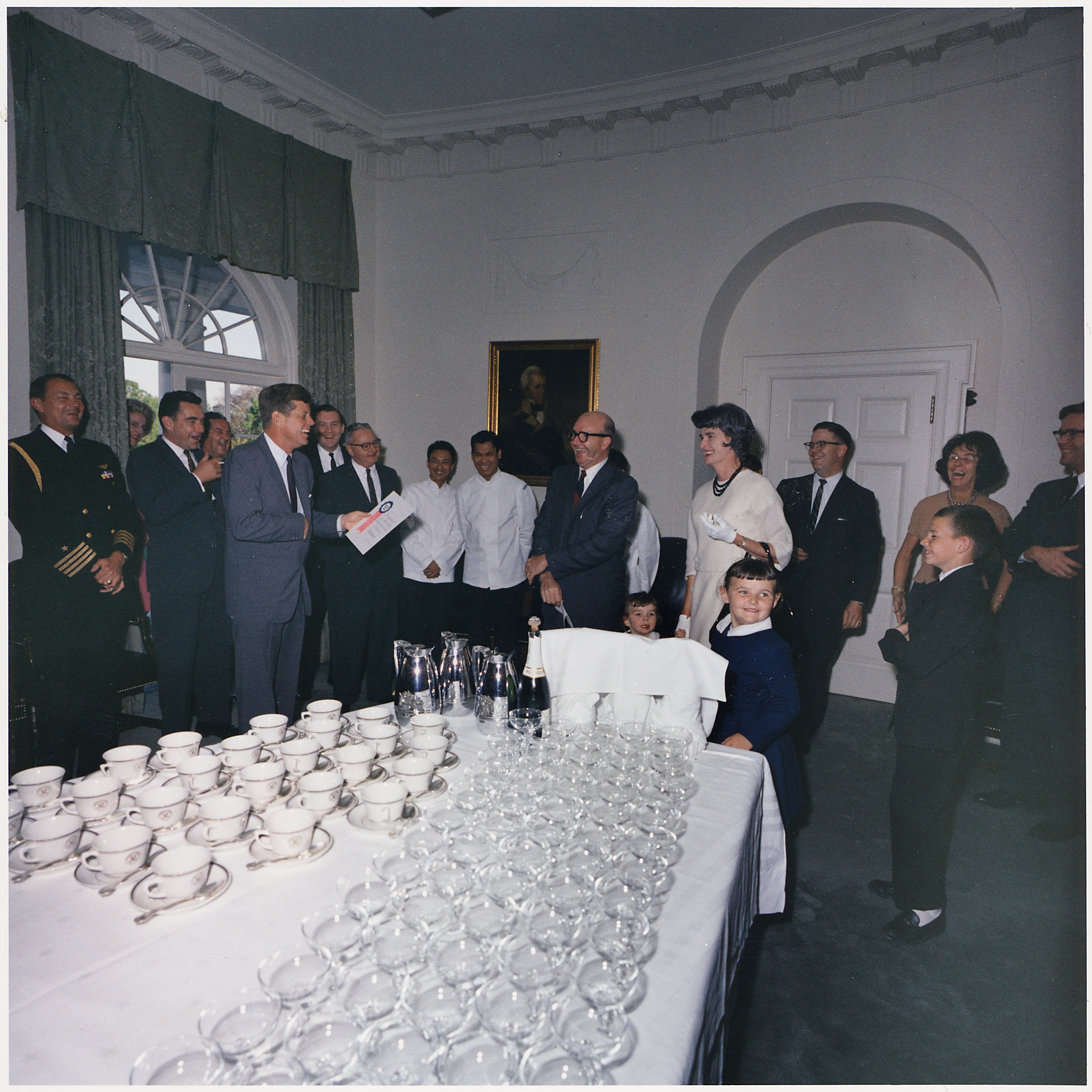
President Kennedy at Powers' 50th birthday party in the White House, 1962

When Kennedy was elected president in 1960, he appointed Powers as Special Assistant to the President. In this role Powers watched "over the President's needs, and was always with him on trips around the country and abroad. He usually was the first to see the President in the morning, and the last to see him at night. He was less a political adviser than simply a friend with whom Kennedy could relax. They would swim together in the White House pool, where Powers would use a breaststroke in order to keep up a steady chatter of amusing conversation that Kennedy enjoyed." Historian Robert Dallek wrote that Powers was part of the "Irish Mafia" - a small group of White House aides who were "uncritically loyal to Kennedy and had made his rise possible", and that "Powers was the first among equals" in this group. Among his duties, Powers greeted distinguished visitors to the White House and escorted them to the Oval Office, and kept track of Kennedy's extensive wardrobe. Kennedy speechwriter and special counsel Theodore Sorensen recounted a story from the 1960 presidential campaign in which he did not have a necktie for a meeting, and "Dave Powers loaned me one from [Kennedy's] large traveling collection, assuring me that the senator never wore it." Powers was an enthusiastic baseball fan, and his "amazing" memory for sports and election statistics impressed Kennedy.

During the assassination of President John F. Kennedy, Powers and Kenneth O'Donnell, another Kennedy aide, were riding in the Secret Service follow-up car directly behind the presidential limousine. In 1996, the Assassination Records Review Board released three minutes of film footage captured by Powers in Dallas prior to the assassination. Powers said he began filming when the motorcade left Love Field but ran out of film at 12:17 p.m before reaching Dealey Plaza.

Following Kennedy's assassination, Powers was named the first curator of the John F. Kennedy Presidential Library and Museum. At the request of Robert F. Kennedy, Powers spent the years from 1965 to 1979 helping federal archivists gather and organize Kennedy memorabilia, papers, and other artifacts for the planned museum. When the Kennedy Library and Museum opened in Boston in 1979, Powers served as a curator at the museum until his retirement in 1994.

In 1972 Powers and O'Donnell co-authored "Johnny, We Hardly Knew Ye", an account of their mutual experiences working for Kennedy. Reflecting on his time with Kennedy, Powers stated that he was "the greatest man I ever met, and the best friend I ever had."

== Death ==
On March 28, 1998 Powers died of cardiac arrest in Arlington, Massachusetts at the Symmes Medical Center.

== Family ==
In 1952 Powers married Josephine (Jo) Lynch, a native of Wilmington, Massachusetts. They had three children and three grandchildren. Powers' granddaughter, Jenny Powers, gained fame as a Broadway actress and performer. An ardent Democrat like her grandfather, she was asked to sing the National Anthem at the 2000 Democratic National Convention in Los Angeles.

== Allegations of impropriety ==
Judith Campbell Exner in her 1977 autobiography Judith Exner: My Story alleged that Powers assisted in setting up her sexual encounters with Kennedy. Powers would later claim that Kennedy never had an affair with Exner, stating that the only Campbell he knew was "chunky vegetable soup." In her book, Once Upon a Secret: My Affair with President John F. Kennedy and Its Aftermath, Mimi Alford claimed that while she was swimming with Kennedy and Powers one afternoon in the indoor White House pool, Kennedy swam to her and whispered a request for her to give oral sex to Powers. Alford wrote that she complied with President Kennedy's request. According to Alford, Powers arranged her first two trysts with Kennedy. Historian Robert Dallek has written that Powers was a "facilitator" of Kennedy's affinity for extramarital relations, discreetly arranging the time and places for trysts with a variety of women. Journalist Seymour Hersh interviewed former Secret Service agent Larry Newman. Newman told Hersh that Powers "would find the women or bring the women along" for extramarital trysts with Kennedy on presidential trips, and alleged that Powers and O'Donnell "could have been better friends, in my opinion...and also they could have had more respect for the security...they were really running a hard risk" in bringing women not checked by security into Kennedy's hotel rooms. In his 2008 memoir Counselor, Ted Sorensen wrote that he "would not be shocked" to learn that Powers had arranged extramarital trysts for Kennedy.

== Bibliography ==
- Alford, Mimi (2012) [2011]. Once Upon a Secret: My Affair with President John F. Kennedy and Its Aftermath. Random House. ISBN 978-1-4000-6910-1.
- Dallek, Robert (2003). An Unfinished Life: John F. Kennedy, 1917–1963. Boston, MA: Little, Brown and Co. ISBN 978-0-316-17238-7.
- Dallek, Robert (2013). Camelot's Court: Inside the Kennedy White House. Harper. ISBN 978-0062065841.
- Hersh, Seymour (1997). The Dark Side of Camelot. Little, Brown & Company. ISBN 0-316-36067-8. - See The Dark Side of Camelot
- Sorensen, Theodore (2008). Counselor: A Life at the Edge of History. New York, NY: Harper. ISBN 978-0060798710.
