= Dong Leshan =

Chinese translator (1924–1999)

- 董乐山
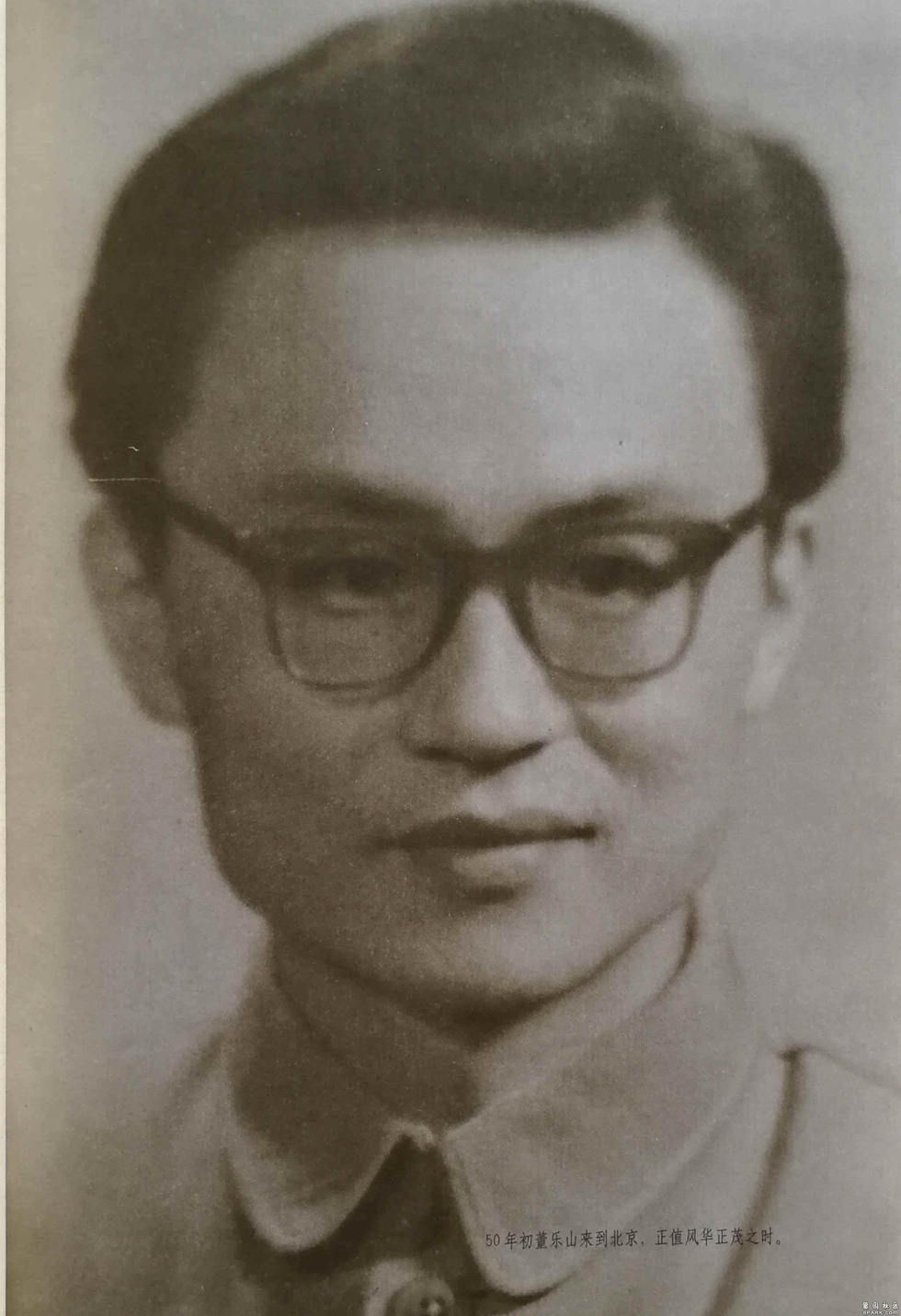
- c. 1950
- Born: 14 November 1924; Ningbo, Zhejiang, China
- Died: 16 January 1999 (aged 74); Beijing, China
- Occupations: Writer and translator

Dong Leshan (Chinese: 董乐山; 14 November 1924 – 16 January 1999) was a Chinese author and translator. Described as "one of the best and most prolific Chinese translators in the 20th century", he had a career that spanned half a century. He translated numerous English publications into Chinese, including The Rise and Fall of the Third Reich, The Glory and the Dream, and Red Star Over China.

== Early life ==
Dong was born on 14 November 1924 in Ningbo, Zhejiang. While in college, he began translating from English to Chinese works. After graduating from St. John's University, Shanghai with a degree in English in 1946, Dong was hired by Xinhua News Agency as one of the first news translators in the country.

== Career ==
Dong translated The Rise and Fall of the Third Reich by William L. Shirer shortly after it was first published in English. Although its circulation was initially restricted, Dong's translation was widely read and a third edition was published in 1971. In the 1970s, he also translated The Glory and the Dream by William Manchester and Red Star Over China by Edgar Snow, alongside several other historical works. Dong produced the most translations in his sixties, when he was working at the Chinese Academy of Social Sciences' Institute of American Studies. He also wrote numerous essays on the problems of translating from English to Chinese.

Dong's translation for Red Star over China included a previously omitted chapter on Comintern advisor Otto Braun (Li De).

== Death ==
Having worked as a translator for over fifty years, Dong died on 16 January 1999 in Beijing.

== Reception ==
Dong was accused of being a "Rightist" during the Anti-Rightist Campaign in 1957. He was persecuted again during the Cultural Revolution (1966–1976). Nonetheless, he was well received by the Chinese literati. In 1994, Dong received the Sino-American Literary Exchange Award for his contributions to translation in China. According to Yuwu Song in the Biographical Dictionary of the People's Republic of China, Dong was "one of the best and most prolific Chinese translators in the 20th century".
