= Controversy and Other Essays in Journalism =

1976 book by William Manchester

- First edition
- Author: William Manchester
- Publisher: Little, Brown
- Publication date: 1976

Controversy and Other Essays in Journalism (1976) is a book of essays by American historian William Manchester. The Controversy in the title is taken from the circumstances surrounding the publication of his 1967 book The Death of a President. The Kennedy family, which had originally cooperated with Manchester, demanded that the author make changes in the manuscript prior to publication. In Controversy, Manchester presents his own detailed account of the affair, which had generated newspaper headlines in 1967.
