= American Caesar =

American Caesar may refer to:

- American Caesar (book), a 1978 biography of Douglas MacArthur by historian William Manchester
- American Caesar (album), a 1993 album by Iggy Pop
