= The Glory and the Dream =

1974 American book by William Manchester

- First edition (publ. Little, Brown)
- Author: William Manchester
- Language: English
- Subject: U.S. history
- Genre: Nonfiction
- Published: 1974
- Publisher: Little, Brown
- Publication place: United States

The Glory and the Dream: A Narrative History of America, 1932–1972 is a 1,400-page social history by William Manchester, first published in 1974. Sometimes sold as two volumes, it describes the history of the United States between 1932 and 1972.

== Content ==
The book details both social history and political machinations in the period with a focus on how the New Deal, the Second World War and the Cold War influenced American culture. Special attention is paid to Roosevelt's New Deal and the lasting effect it had on the U.S. government. Manchester simplifies the complex political maneuvers and opaque terminology that pervaded Cold War politics to more accessible language.

The book's title is taken from William Wordsworth's poem "Ode: Intimations of Immortality": "Whither is fled the visionary gleam? / Where is it now, the glory and the dream?"

== Release and reception ==
The Glory and the Dream was listed as a New York Times bestseller in 1975. In The Scotsman, Michael Aitken called it "a collossal piece of nostalgia that brings to mind G.K. Chesterton's insight that the real American is all right: it is the ideal American who is all wrong."

Dong Leshan contributed to the proofreading of the book's Chinese translation.
