= Robert A. Potash =

American historian

- Born: Robert Aaron Potash; January 2, 1921; Boston, Massachusetts, U.S.
- Died: December 30, 2016 (aged 95); Amherst, Massachusetts, U.S.
- Education: Harvard University (BA, MA, PhD)
- Occupation: Historian
- Employer: University of Massachusetts Amherst
- Known for: Research on the military influence in 20th century Argentine
- Spouse: Jeanne Feinstein (1943-2016)
- Children: 2

Robert A. Potash (1921–2016) was an American historian who specialized in studying the role of the military in Argentina in the 20th century. His books include The Army and Politics in the Argentine Republic (3 volumes) and Perón and the GOU. He was a professor emeritus at the University of Massachusetts Amherst and a corresponding member of both the Mexican Academy of History and the National Academy of History of Argentina.

== Biography ==
=== Early life and education ===
Potash was born in Boston, Massachusetts, on January 2, 1921 to Philip and Sarah Potash (née Simes). In spite of their Latvian and Russian Jewish background, Potash family members were secular, and he was brought up agnostic. The young Potash completed his studies at the Boston Latin School in 1938, and then he enrolled at Harvard University, where he received a magna cum laude Bachelor of Arts degree in History in 1942. Between 1942 and 1946 Potash served in the United States Army, spending eleven months of this period in the Pacific area, where he was assigned to the 41st Japanese Order of Battle Team. Arriving in Okinawa when the battle for the island was already over, he was spare from taking part in the invasion of Japan by the atomic bombings of Hiroshima and Nagasaki. After Japan's surrender, Potash stayed on Okinawa with the Tenth Army Intelligence to help secure Kume Shima's Japanese garrison capitulation and repatriate prisoners from the Ryukyu Islands. Potash resumed his studies of History at Harvard in 1946; the same year he married Jeanne Feinstein, whom he had met in 1943 when she was a sophomore in the University of Illinois. In 1947 he obtained a master's degree in Art History from Harvard University and in 1953 a doctorate in Mexican History. His doctoral thesis on the 19th-century Avío Bank of México was published by Fondo de Cultura Económica in 1959, later becoming a landmark study in Mexican economic history.

=== Career ===
From 1955 to 1957, right after the fall of President Peron, Potash worked in Argentina as an envoy or the Bureau of Intelligence and Research of the US Department of State. His stay in Buenos Aires prompted Potash interest in the 20th century history of Argentina's army. In the 1950s, he was hired by the University of Massachusetts Amherst, choosing as his research topics the economic history of Mexico and the relationship between the Army and politics in Argentina, a subject that occupied him from then on. A frequent contributor to both the Conference on Latin American History (CLAH) and the New England Council of Latin American Studies (NECLAS), Potash was also a member of the editorial boards for The American Historical Review and the Hispanic American Historical Review. In 1978 he developed a project with the University of Massachusetts Computing Center to improve the access to the General Archives of Notarial Records (Archivo General de Notarías) of Mexico.

His book The Army and Politics in Argentina (1928-1973), in three volumes, changed the perspective of Argentine historiography by conducting an exhaustive study of the main player in Argentine during that period, marked by political instability and military coups. Even if intended for academics, the three books became best-sellers in Argentina. On the subject of military influence in 20th-century Argentine politics, Potash developed a friendly rivalry with French political scientist Alain Rouquié, author of several seminal works on the armed forces and democracy in Latin America. While Rouquié is regarded as more analytical and focused on thematic interpretation, Potash was widely praised for his rigorous empirical data and exhaustive archival research.

Potash was appointed a corresponding member of the National Academy of History of the Argentine Republic and in Mexico as a correspondent of the Mexican Academy of History. Potash spent more than three decades at the University of Massachusetts Amherst, joining as an instructor in 1950 and concluding his career in 1986 as the Haring Professor of Latin American History. During the 1990s, Potash was invited by President Carlos Menem to take part in the Commission of Inquiry into the Activities of Nazism in Argentina (CEANA). He wrote an article for the commission about the German technicians who worked with the Argentine Army in the postwar. In 2008, already retired in Amherst, Potash wrote his memoires, Looking Back at My First Eighty Years: A Mostly Professional Memoir, a detailed account of his academic and personal life. Robert A. Potash died in Amherst on December 30, 2016, at the age of 95.

== Selected bibliography ==
- Potash, R. A. (1959). El Banco de Avío de México: El fomento de la industria, 1821-1846. Fondo de Cultura Económica.
- Potash, R. A. (1969). The army & politics in Argentina, 1928–1945: Yrigoyen to Perón (Vol. 1). Stanford University Press.
- Potash, R. A. (1980). The army & politics in Argentina, 1945–1962: Perón to Frondizi (Vol. 2). Stanford University Press.
- Potash, R. A. (1996). The army & politics in Argentina, 1962–1973: From Frondizi's fall to the Peronist restoration (Vol. 3). Stanford University Press.
- Potash, R. A. (1984). Perón y el G.O.U.: Los documentos de una logia secreta. Editorial Sudamericana.

== See also ==
- Robert N. Burr
- John Henry Coatsworth
