= Mimi Alford =

American White House intern (b. 1943)

- Born: Marion Fay Beardsley; May 7, 1943 (age 83); New York City, New York, U.S.
- Other names: Marion Beardsley Alford; Marion Fahnestock
- Spouses: Tony Fahnestock (m. 1964; div. 1990) Richard Alford (after 2005)

Marion Fay "Mimi" Alford (née Beardsley; born May 7, 1943) is an American woman who had an affair with President John F. Kennedy while she served as an intern in the White House press office between 1962 and 1963.

Despite the affair's consuming influence over her life at the time, Alford managed to keep the illicit trysts a secret for 40 years, until clues were leaked in 2003. Alford published her own book about the affair, Once Upon a Secret, in 2011.

== Early life ==
Marion Fay Beardsley was born in New York City, and was raised in Middletown Township, New Jersey. She was educated at Miss Porter's School in Connecticut. While working as an editor in 1961 at her high school newspaper, the Salmagundy, she wrote to the White House and requested an interview with Jacqueline Kennedy, who herself had been an editor of Salmagundy at Miss Porter's School. Mrs. Kennedy was unable to fit a meeting into her schedule, but her social secretary, Letitia Baldrige, also a Miss Porter's alumna, invited Beardsley to come to the White House and interview her about Mrs. Kennedy. She briefly met President Kennedy during this visit.

In Beardsley's first year at Wheaton College, the White House offered her an open position as a summer intern in the White House press office; she accepted and began her internship in 1962. She was asked back for the following summer and visited the White House in between.

== White House intern and Kennedy affair allegation ==
On her fourth day in the White House press office, President Kennedy’s special assistant, Dave Powers, asked Beardsley if she would like to join a group in the residence's swimming pool, where, to her surprise, they were joined by President Kennedy. She was asked to join a cocktail party in the residence that evening, and the President offered her a personal tour of the home. After Kennedy led her into Jackie's powder-blue bedroom, she and Kennedy had sex, which was Beardsley's first sexual encounter.

The resultant affair lasted 18 months, during which time Beardsley, still a Wheaton student, met Tony Fahnestock, a student at Williams, and they became engaged. The affair with the President began to cool and he sometimes humiliated her. The pressures of her double life drove her to leave college after her sophomore year. Alford said that she and the President did not have sexual relations after August 1963 when JFK's son Patrick died, though she retained her position in the White House. She was disappointed to be dropped from the trip to Dallas, Texas with Kennedy in November 1963, but Jacqueline had decided to go there with him. The last time she saw Kennedy, on November 15, 1963, he gave her $300 cash as a wedding present and asked that she buy "something fantastic" to wear, "then come back and show me." She bought a gray suit.

== Later life ==
Several hours after Kennedy was assassinated, Beardsley broke down and confessed the affair to her fiancé Tony Fahnestock. Although he was deeply hurt and angry, they married on schedule, in January 1964. The marriage produced two daughters and ended in divorce in 1990. Fahnestock died of cancer three years after the divorce, at age 52. Beardsley returned to college and graduated in 1994. She married Richard Alford, a sports marketing executive with IMG, in 2005. Alford is a grandmother and a retired New York City church administrator.

== Revelation of affair ==
In 2002, while historian Robert Dallek was researching his biography An Unfinished Life: John F. Kennedy, 1917–1963, he came across a 1964 interview with Kennedy press aide Barbara Gamarekian in the JFK Presidential Library. The interview was one of scores collected by the Library as part of their oral history program, that described, in a roundabout way, Kennedy's dalliances with an intern named Mimi who "couldn't type" (page 24 of interview), who "had no skills" (page 24 of interview), "who obviously couldn't perform any function at all" (page 25 of interview) and others who worked in the press office, but "obviously she did have sort of a special relationship with the President. I don't know quite what it was" (page 17 of interview).

At Gamarekian's request in 1964, this part of her interview was permanently sealed, but Dallek persuaded her to unseal it so that he might include in his biography a mention of a "tall, slender, beautiful" intern among Kennedy's White House diversions, in the context of his argument that Kennedy was undistracted from duty by health troubles or women. The unsealed section was leaked by a JFK Library archivist on April 24, 2003, six days before Dallek's publication date.

Reporters hastened to identify the intern and on May 13 the New York Daily News ran a front-page teaser headline, "Fun and Games with Mimi in the White House", for its exposé, "JFK had a Monica". Alford confirmed the affair in a statement, but made no further comment at that time.

Later when Once Upon a Secret was published, Alford wrote that not only had she stumbled upon Gamarekian's oral interview at the JFK Presidential Library, but also Christine Camp's oral interview, and in particular one made on November 24, 1969, which referred to Alford without naming her, but some terms were strikingly similar to Gamarekian's:

It was a concern to me in certain instances because there was a member of my staff who would have fit that description, if you're going to put it on those grounds. To be absolutely candid about it, we had a member of the staff, the press staff, who served as a receptionist, who could, I suppose, have been described as a presidential favorite or a staff favorite. Her abilities and skills and capacity to maintain a job in the press office were not immediately apparent to anyone who was associated with her. Very pleasant girl; did what she could, but she was not a typist; she did not take shorthand; she was not skilled in clerical or stenographic work. In other words, she was filling a chair which could have been filled by somebody else had those skills been readily needed—and they were.

== Once Upon a Secret ==
After the intrusive press attention of 2003, Alford felt she should try to take control of the story of her own life, and she began to write with her husband's encouragement. An executive editor at Random House looked at about 20 pages and acquired the rights for "close to seven figures" in 2009. Originally subtitled My Hidden Affair with John F. Kennedy, Alford's book was published in April 2011 by Hutchinson Radius, an imprint of Penguin Random House Group, and marketed as "a woman's coming-of-age story". According to the New York Times, "Ms. Alford claims to be completely purged of guilt, grief and baggage by the cleansing process of acknowledging past mistakes. And she describes a happy new marriage."

Once Upon a Secret spent several weeks on the New York Times Best Seller list, the NPR Hardcover Nonfiction Best Seller list, and the Los Angeles Times Best Seller list.

In an interview with Ann Curry on February 9, 2012, Alford stated that at the time she did not feel guilty about the fact that the President was married, although in hindsight, "I feel guilty about not having felt guilty about Mrs. Kennedy."

In a subsequent interview with People magazine she stated, "if I was 19...I would do it again—it's hard to say I wouldn't."
