= The Arms of Krupp =

1968 history book by William Manchester

The Arms of Krupp, 1587-1968
- First edition
- Author: William Manchester
- Subject: Krupp dynasty
- Genre: non-fiction
- Publisher: Little, Brown
- Publication date: 1968
- OCLC: 237115

The Arms of Krupp (1968) is William Manchester's history of the Krupp family, which owned a dominant armaments manufacturing company based in Essen, Germany.

== Synopsis ==
The book presents readable and often humorous descriptions of the Krupp family and its businesses from the Thirty Years' War to the Kaisers, the Weimar Republic, the Nazis, the American occupation, and finally the Bonn government.

Manchester's book describes family members in detail, from the first Krupp (circa 1500) "a shrewd chandler with a keen eye for the main chance," through the family's incarnation by the sixth generation as "Essen's uncrowned kings," to the powerful weapons company that armed Germany for three major wars, and finally the dissolution of the business. In Manchester's retelling, he describes every member as having some unfortunate trait, and all as somewhat malevolent.

The book describes how the family and its business received generally favorable treatment from the government, such as a personal decree by Adolf Hitler in 1943, the "Lex Krupp", which granted Alfried Krupp sole ownership of the company Fried. Krupp AG.

The book examines to what extent German industry has part of the moral responsibility for the acts of the German state during World War II. Alfried Krupp profited directly from his company's illegal seizures of assets in occupied Europe. The Nazi war effort created a huge demand for workers in the armaments industry; although a mobilization of women into the labor force was ruled out due to ideological reasons. Instead the Nazis opted to meet the demand for workers with slave laborers. The Krupp AG owned private concentration camps and leased enslaved workers from the SS at the cost of four Reichsmarks per day. Those used as slaves for the industry were either inmates at extermination camps, POWs captured during the Nacht und Nebel program, or foreign civilians deported from Nazi-occupied countries (known as ostarbeiters). The surviving former slaves were not compensated adequately after the war for their sufferings. After the war Alfried Krupp was convicted of crimes against humanity.

== Critical response ==
Time gave the book a mixed review in 1968, stating:

The result is an often flawed, some times naive but largely fascinating chronicle whose inflated pretensions as a work of real scholarship are punctured by swarms of errors. As a work of history, the book is marred, too, by an overwrought style and an unbecomingly snide use of irony. Manchester is not fond of the Germans, and he caricatures them either as superefficient and slavishly obedient or as a folk barely removed from dwarfs and dragons, blood feuds and bags of tainted gold.
