= The Last Lion: Winston Spencer Churchill =

Trilogy of biographies covering the life of Winston Churchill

- Author: William Manchester
- Country: United States
- Language: English
- Genre: Biography
- Publisher: Little, Brown and Company
- Published: 1983, 1988, 2012
- No. of books: 3

The Last Lion: Winston Spencer Churchill is a trilogy of biographies covering the life of Winston Churchill. The first two were published in the 1980s by author and historian William Manchester, who died while working on the last volume. Before his death in 2004, Manchester selected Paul Reid to complete it, and the final volume was published in 2012.

Manchester suffered for several years from two strokes following the death of his wife in 1998. The strokes severely impaired his ability to write, making him unable to complete the third volume. After completing about 100,000 words of the volume he agreed to consider working with a collaborator, ultimately settling on Paul Reid, a former feature writer for Cox Newspapers to complete the work.

Volumes:

1. Visions of Glory, 1874–1932 (973 pages, published in 1983)
2. Alone, 1932–1940 (756 pages, published in 1988)
3. Defender of the Realm, 1940–1965 (1232 pages, published in 2012, completed by Paul Reid after Manchester's death)
The cover of the first US edition of the first volume

The cover of the first US edition of the second volume

The cover of the first US edition of the third volume
