= Paul Reid (writer) =

American journalist

Paul Reid is a journalist and author.

== Early years ==
Reid worked in manufacturing before earning a bachelor's degree from Harvard Extension School at Harvard University in 1990 and beginning a career in journalism.

Reid was for a decade at the turn of the millennium a feature writer for The Palm Beach Post.

== Biographer of Churchill ==
Reid completed The Last Lion: Defender of the Realm, William Manchester's long anticipated third volume of his best-selling biography of Winston Churchill after being asked to do so by Manchester in ill-health and terminal decline just one year before his 2004 death. Reid, who had befriended Manchester half a dozen years earlier, was selected by Manchester above many notable names. The proceeds from the book were to be shared equally.

On 1 June 2004, Manchester died of stomach cancer, leaving Reid alone to complete the work. The publisher elected to have Bill Phillips shepherd the author. Reid discounted Manchester's thesis about Churchill's mental illness, and favoured the man as he struggled through stressful and depressing times. In Reid's opinion, Churchill mastered alcohol.

The biography was issued in 2012, and was hailed by the trade press. The publisher's advance of US$200,000 was insufficient to float the author through nine years of research and writing, and he needed to invest copious amounts in the finished product. As of 2012, Reid and Phillips had yet to meet in person.
