= John Henry Coatsworth =

American historian (born 1940)

- Born: September 27, 1940 (age 85); New York City, New York, United States
- Education: Wesleyan University; University of Wisconsin–Madison
- Scientific career
- Fields: Latin American history
- Workplaces: Columbia University (current); School of International and Public Affairs; University of Chicago; Harvard University; El Colegio de México; National Autonomous University of Mexico; National University of Buenos Aires; Instituto Torcuato di Tella; Instituto Ortega y Gassett

John Henry Coatsworth (born September 27, 1940) is an American historian of Latin America and the former provost of Columbia University. From 2012 until June 30, 2019, Coatsworth served as Columbia provost. From 2007 until February 2012 Coatsworth was the dean of Columbia's School of International and Public Affairs (SIPA), and served concurrently as interim provost beginning in 2011. Coatsworth is a scholar of Latin American economic, social and international history, with an emphasis on Mexico, Central America, and the Caribbean.

== Biography ==
Coatsworth received his B.A. degree in history from Wesleyan University (1963) and his M.A. (1967) and Ph.D. (1972) degrees in economic history from the University of Wisconsin–Madison. He taught at the University of Chicago from 1969 until 1992 and at Harvard University until 2006. His other academic posts have included visiting professorships at El Colegio de México, the National Autonomous University of Mexico, the National University of Buenos Aires, the Instituto Torcuato di Tella in Buenos Aires, and the Instituto Ortega y Gassett in Madrid.

Coatsworth is the author or editor of eight books and many scholarly articles on Latin American economic and international history. He is a former president of the American Historical Association and Latin American Studies Association. At Harvard University, he served as the founding director of the David Rockefeller Center for Latin American Studies from its creation in 1994 until 2006. He also chaired the Harvard University Committee on Human Rights Studies. He is a member of The Council on Foreign Relations, the board of directors of the Tinker Foundation, the board of trustees and the scientific council of the Foundation Institute IMDEA Social Sciences, and numerous professional associations.

He has served on the editorial boards of numerous scholarly journals, including the American Historical Review, the Journal of Economic History, and the Hispanic American Historical Review and as well as social science and history journals published in Britain, Chile, Germany, Mexico, Peru, and Spain. Coatsworth's most recent book is Living Standards in Latin American History: Height, Welfare and Development, 1750–2000 (Cambridge: David Rockefeller Center for Latin American Studies, Harvard University, 2010), edited with Ricardo Salvatore and Amilcar Challú. His research and publications have focused on comparative economic, social, and international history of Latin America, especially Mexico, Central America, and the Caribbean.

Coatsworth was awarded the John Simon Guggenheim Foundation Fellowship in 1986, served as Senior Fulbright Lecturer three times (for appointments in Argentina and Mexico), and has received research and institutional grants from public agencies and private foundations in the United States and elsewhere. He has also acted as a consultant for program design or review to numerous U.S. universities and private foundations. In 2005, he was elected to membership in the American Academy of Arts and Sciences.

== Controversy ==
While addressing the President of Iran's upcoming visit to the Columbia University campus on Fox News, Coatsworth was asked whether the administration would have allowed Adolf Hitler to speak on campus in 1936, when Germany was still a democracy if he had asked. Coatsworth replied that "If he [Hitler] were willing to engage in a debate and a discussion to be challenged by Columbia students and faculty, we would certainly invite him."

Asked to clarify his remarks on September 24 on CNN Coatsworth said: "Look, if Hitler had come to the Columbia University in 1936, [when Germany was still a democracy, and no one understood the atrocities of what was to come] I would have been outside with the peaceful protesters. Or if I had been dean, I would have been inside presenting him to our students to be challenged. You can't choose your role in life. You can only choose the principles you have to live by. And in this case, we're providing not a platform but a classroom and we're going to challenge this guy as he has not been challenged in other places."

Coatsworth has advocated for the U.S. to abide by and strengthen global rules and norms. "The United States faces a fundamental issue and that issue is, how do we create international and global institutions that function effectively and will continue to function effectively when the U.S. is no longer a global super power", Coatsworth said in an April 9, 2010, interview with Charlie Rose on PBS.

== Publications ==
=== Books ===
- Cambridge Economic History of Latin America, edited with Victor Bulmer Thomas and Roberto Cortes Conde (2 vols., Cambridge: Cambridge University Press, in press)
- Culturas Encontradas: Cuba y los Estados Unidos, edited with Rafael Hernandez (Havana: Centro de Investigación y Desarrollo de la Cultura Cubana Juan Marinello and the David Rockefeller Center for Latin American Studies, Harvard University, 2001).
- Latin America and the World Economy Since 1800, edited with Alan M. Taylor (Cambridge: Harvard University Press, 1999).
- The United States and Central America: The Clients and the Colossus (New York: Twayne, 1994).
- Los orígenes del atraso: Nueve ensayos de historia económica de Mexico, siglos XVIII y XIX (Mexico: Alianza Editorial Mexicana, 1990).
- Images of Mexico in the United States, edited with Carlos M. Rico (San Diego: Center for U.S.-Mexican Studies, University of California, San Diego, 1989). Spanish edition: Imágenes de México en Estado Unidos (Mexico City: Fondo de Cultura Económica, 1989).
- Growth Against Development: The Economic Impact of Railroads in Porfirian Mexico (DeKalb: Northern Illinois University Press, 1981); Spanish editions: Mexico, Sep Setentas, 1976; second edition, Mexico, Ediciones Era, 1984.

=== Articles and book chapters ===
- "Political Economy and Economic Organization in the Iberian New World, " chapter 7, volume 1 of Cambridge Economic History of Latin America, edited with Victor Bulmer Thomas and Roberto Cortes Conde (Cambridge: Cambridge University Press, in press).
- "Structures, Endowments, Institutions, and Growth in Latin American Economic History", Latin American Research Review (forthcoming 2005).
- "Always Protectionist? Latin American Tariffs from Independence to Great Depression", with Jeffrey G. Williamson, Journal of Latin American Studies, 36:2 (May 2004): 205–232.
- "La muerte y la resurrección del nacionalismo económico de México" in Enrique Semo, ed., El nacionalismo mexicano ayer y hoy (Mexico City: Secretaría de Cultura, Gobierno del DF, forthcoming, 2004).
- "Globalization, Growth, and Welfare in History" in Marcelo Suarez Orozco and Desiré Baolian Qin-Hilliard, eds., Globalization: Culture and Education in the New Millennium (Berkeley: University of California Press, 2004), pp. 38–55.
- "The Roots of Latin American Protectionism: Looking Before the Great Depression", with Jeffrey G. Williamson (National Bureau of Economic Research, Paper No. w8999, June 2002); revised version published in Antoni Estevadeordal et al., eds., Integrating the Americas: FTAA and Beyond (Cambridge: Harvard University Press, 2004), pp. 37–73; reprinted in Kevin O’Rourke, ed., The International Trading System, Globalization and History (forthcoming).
- "Institutions and Long-Run Economic Performance in Mexico and Spain, 1800–2000", with Gabriel Tortella Casares, Working Papers on Latin America, Paper No. 02/03-1 (David Rockefeller Center for Latin American Studies, Harvard University, 2002).
- "La independencia de Cuba en la historia de América Latina" in Espacios, silencios y los sentidos de la libertad: Cuba entre 1878 y 1912 edited by Fernando Martínez Heredia, Rebecca J. Scott, and Orlando F. García Martínez (Havana: Unión de Escritores y Artistas de Cuba, 2001), pp. 346–355.
- "El Estado y la actividad económica colonial", in Procesos americanos de redefinición colonial, vol. 4 of Historia general de América Latina, edited by Enrique Tandeter and Jorge Hidalgo Lehuedé (Paris: UNESCO, 2000), pp. 301–323.
- "Cycles of Globalization, Economic Growth, and Human Welfare in Latin America" in Globalization and the Rural Environment edited by Otto T. Solbrig, Robert Paarlberg, and Francesco di Castri (Cambridge, Massachusetts: David Rockefeller Center for Latin American Studies and Harvard University Press, 2001), pp. 23–47; Spanish trans. In Fractal (Mexico City, forthcoming).
- "Crecimiento Económico en el Espacio Peruano 1681–1800: una visión a partir de la agricultura", with Carlos Newland, Revista de Historia Económica (Madrid), 18:2 (2000): 377–391.
- "Introduction to the Harvard Edition" of Stephen Kinser and Stephen Schlesinger, Bitter Fruit: The Untold Story of the American Coup in Guatemala (Cambridge: Harvard University Press, 1999), pp. ix-xviii.
- "The United States and Democracy in Mexico" in The United States and Latin America edited by James Dunkerley and Victor Bulmer-Thomas (London: University of London, Institute for Latin American Studies, forthcoming 1999), pp. 141–155.
- "Economic and Institutional Trajectories in Nineteenth-Century Latin America" in Latin America and the World Economy Since 1800, edited with Alan M. Taylor (Cambridge: Harvard University Press, 1998), pp. 23–54; published in Spanish as "Trayectorias económicas e institucionales en América Latina durante el siglo xix", Anuario IEHS, (trans. María Alejandra Irigoin, Tandil, Argentina: Facultad de Ciencias Humanas, Instituto de Estudios Histórico-Sociales, Universidad Nacional del Centro), no. 14 (1999), pp. 149–175.
- "Introduction" (with Alan M. Taylor) in Latin America and the World Economy Since 1800, edited with Alan M. Taylor (Cambridge: Harvard University Press, 1998), pp. 1–17.
- "Measuring Influence: The United States and the Mexican Peasantry", in Rural Revolt in Mexico: U.S. Intervention and the Domain of Subaltern Politics edited by Daniel Nugent (Durham: Duke University Press, 1998), 64–71. Revised and updated version of "Comment on 'The United States and the Mexican Peasantry'" in Rural Revolt in Mexico and U.S. Intervention edited by Daniel Nugent (San Diego: Center for U.S.-Mexican Studies, University of California, San Diego, Monograph Series, no. 27, 1988), 61–68.
- "Presidential Address: Welfare", American Historical Review, 101:1 (February 1996): 1–12; Spanish edition, "En torno de la historia del bienestar", Desarrollo Económico: Revista de Ciencias Sociales (Buenos Aires), 36:144 (Enero-Marzo, 1977): 991–1003.
- "Trastornos de la transición: México otra vez", Meridiano CERI (Madrid), 3 (May 1995): 17–20.
- "Pax (Norte)Americana: Latin America After the Cold War" in Past as Prelude: History in the Making of a New World Order edited by Meredith Woo-Cumings and Michael Loriaux (Boulder: Westview Press, 1993), 159–177; Spanish edition, "Pax (Norte)Americana: América Latina despues de la guerra fría", Revista Mexicana de Sociología, 45:2 (Abril–Junio 1994): 293–314.
- "The Economic Impact of Independence in Latin America" in La independencia de América Latina: Consecuencias económicas edited by Leandro Prados de la Escosura and Samuel Amaral, (Madrid: Alianza, 1993), 17–27.
- "Notes on the Comparative Economic History of Latin America and the United States" in Nord und Süd in Amerika: Gegensätze, Gemeinsamkeiten, Europäischer Hintergrund edited by Wolfgang Reinhard and Peter Waldmann (Berlin: Rombach Verlag, 1993), 595–612; reprinted in Development and Underdevelopment in America: Contrasts of Economic Growth in North and Latin America in Historical Perspective edited by W.L. Bernecker and H.W. Tobler (Berlin: de Gruyter, 1993), pp. 10–30; German trans. "Die Wirtschaftsgeschichte Lateinamerikas und der USA im Vergleich: Einige Anmerkungen" in Die Vielen Amerikas: Die Neue Welt zwischen 1800 und 1930, edited by F. Edelmayer, B. Hausberger, and H. W. Tobler (Frankfurt a.M., Germany: Brandes und Apsel and Vienna, Austria: Südwind, 2000), pp. 35–52.
- "Economic History and the History of Prices in Latin America" in Essays on Latin American Price History edited by Lyman Johnson and Enrique Tandeter (Albuquerque: University of New Mexico Press, 1990), 21–33; Spanish translation "Historia económica e historia de precios en la Latinoamérica colonial" en Economías coloniales: Precios y salarios en América Latina, siglo xviii (Mexico: Fondo de Cultura Económica, 1991), pp. 31–44.
- "Images of Mexico in the United States: Introduction", (with coeditor Carlos M. Rico) in Images of Mexico in the United States (San Diego: Center for U.S.-Mexican Studies, University of California, San Diego, 1989), 1–13.
- "La historiografía económica de México", Revista de Historia Económica, 6:2 (1988): 277–291.
- "Patterns of Rural Rebellion in Latin America: Mexico in Comparative Perspective" in Riot, Rebellion, and Revolution: Rural Social Conflict in Mexico edited by Friedrich Katz (Princeton: Princeton University Press, 1988), 21–62. Spanish edition (Mexico: Ediciones Era, 1990), volume 1, 27–61.
- "The Decline of the Mexican Economy, 1800–1860" in La formación de las economías latinoamericanas y los intereses económicos europeos en la época de Simón Bolívar edited by Reinhard Liehr (Berlin: Colloquium Verlag, 1989), 27–53.
- "The Mexican Mining Industry in the Eighteenth Century" in The Economies of Mexico and Peru During the Late Colonial Period, 1760–1810 edited by Nils Jacobsen and Hans-Jürgen Puhle (Berlin: Colloquium Verlag, 1986), 26–45; reprinted in Mines of Silver and Gold in the Americas edited by Peter Bakewell (Aldershot, UK: Variorum, 1997), 263–282.
- "El Estado y el sector externo en México, 1810–1910", Secuencia: Revista Americana de Ciencias Sociales, 2 (1985): 40–54.
- "Cliometrics and Mexican History", Historical Methods 18:1 (Winter, 1985): 31–37.
- "The Limits of Colonial Absolutism: Mexico in the Eighteenth Century" in Essays in the Political, Economic and Social History of Colonial Latin America edited by Karen Spalding (Newark, Delaware: University of Delaware, Latin American Studies Program, Occasional Papers and Monographs No. 3, 1982), 25–51. (Conference Prize, Conference on Latin American History).
- "México: del atraso al subdesarrollo", Dialogos: Artes, Letras, Ciencias Humanas, 108 (noviembre-diciembre, 1982): 43–51.
- "Themes in Search of Historians: The Nineteenth Century" in Labor and Laborers through Mexican History edited by Else C. Frost, Michael C. Meyer and Josefina Z. Vázquez (Mexico: El Colegio de México, 1979): 870–874.
- "The Emergence of the Modern State in Latin America" in The New Thrust of U.S. - Latin American Relations: Proceedings of the Tenth Annual Quad Cities World Affairs Conference edited by Daniel E. Lee (Rock Island, IL: Quad Cities World Affairs Council, 1979), 31–36.
- "Indispensable Railroads in a Backward Economy", Journal of Economic History, 39:4 (December 1979): 939–960. (Honorable Mention, Conference Prize, Conference on Latin American History); reprinted in Spanish in Enrique Cárdenas, ed., Historia económica de México, vol. 64 of Carlos Bazdresch P., director, Lecturas (Mexico: Fondo de Cultura Económica, 1992), 201–229.
- "Características generales de la economía mexicana en el siglo XIX" in Ensayos sobre el desarrollo económico de México y América Latina, 1500–1975 edited by Enrique Florescano (Mexico: Fondo de Cultura Económica, 1979): 171–186; reprinted in Spanish in Enrique Cárdenas, ed., Historia Económica de México (Mexico: Fondo de Cultura Económica, 1990), 13–26.
- "Obstacles to Economic Growth in Nineteenth-Century Mexico", American Historical Review, 83:1 (February 1978): 80–100; reprinted in Modern Political Economy and Latin America: Theory and Policy edited by Jeffry Frieden, Manuel Pastor, Jr., and Michael Tomz (Boulder, CO: Westview Press, 2000), pp. 97–109; published in Spanish translation in Instituto Nacional de Estadística, Geografía, e Informática (INEGI), Estadísticas Históricas de México (2 vols., Mexico: INEGI, 1985), vol. 1, 299–307.
- "Anotaciones sobre la producción de alimentos durante el Porfiriato", Historia Mexicana, 26:2 (Octubre–Diciembre 1976): 167–176; reprinted in Carlos Marichal Salinas, ed., La economía mexicana: Siglos xix y xx (vol. 4 of Lecturas de Historia Mexicana, Mexico: Colegio de México, 1992), 136–156.
- "Los orígenes del autoritarismo moderno en México", Foro Internacional, 16:2 (Octubre-Diciembre 1975): 205–232; reprinted in Leopoldo Allub, ed., Orígenes del autoritarismo en América Latina (Mexico: Editorial Katun, 1983), 197–218.
- "Railroads, Landholding and Agrarian Protest in the Early Porfiriato", Hispanic American Historical Review, 54:1 (February 1974): 48–71. (Honorable Mention, Robertson Memorial Prize, Conference on Latin American History). Reprinted in W. Dirk Raat, ed., Mexico from Independence to Revolution (Durham: Duke University Press, 1982), 260–272.
- "American Trade with European Colonies in the Caribbean and South America, 1790–1815", William and Mary Quarterly, 3d ser., 24:2, (April 1967): 243–266; reprinted in William Appleman Williams, ed., The Shaping of American Diplomacy: Readings and Documents in American Foreign Relations (Chicago: Rand McNally, 1970), 91–97.

=== Short articles and commentary ===
- "Prologo" to La fábula del tiburón y las sardines by Juan Jos´Arevalo (Guatemala, forthcoming).
- "Preface" to The Cuban Economy at the Start of the Twenty-first Century edited by Jorge Dominguez, Omar Everleny Perez Villanueva, and Lorena Barberia (Cambridge, Massachusetts: David Rockefeller Center for Latin American Studies, dist. By Harvard University Press, 2004).
- "Preface", with Enrique Iglesias, Andres Velasco, et al., eds., Integrating the Americas: FTAA and Beyond (Cambridge: Harvard University Press, 2004).
- "Mexico" and "Mexico City", in The Oxford Encyclopedia of Economic History edited by Joel Mokyr (New York: Oxford University Press, 2003), pp. 501–509.
- "The Roots of Violence in Colombia", ReVista: Harvard Review of Latin America, Spring 2003.
- "Internationalizing Human Rights", ReVista: Harvard Review of Latin America, Fall 2003.
- "America and Latin America: Time for a New Strategy", Harvard Magazine,104:3 (January–February 2002): 25–27.
- "Commentary", in Latinos Remaking America edited by Marcelo Suárez-Orozco and Mariela M. Páez (Berkeley: University of California Press and the David Rockefeller Center for Latin American Studies, Harvard University, 2002): 94–96.
- "Commentary on Sylvia Schmelkes, 'Education and Indian Peoples in Mexico: An Example of Policy Failure'" in Unequal Schools, Unequal Chances: The Challenges of Equal Opportunity in the Americas edited by Fernando Reimers (Cambridge, Massachusetts: Harvard University David Rockefeller Center for Latin American Studies, 2001), pp. 335–338.
- "Prologo" to Friedrich Katz, Ensayos mexicanos (Mexico: Alianza Editorial Mexicana, 1994).
- "Comment", Hispanic American Historical Review, 69:3 (1989): 538–545.
- "Comentario al ensayo de Enrique Cárdenas, 'Algunas cuestiones sobre la depresión de México en el siglo XIX,'" HISLA, 3 (1984): 68–71.
- "Central America", Bulletin of the Atomic Scientists, 40:1 (January 1984): 10–12.

=== Book reviews ===
Published in Americas, Business History Review, Economía y Demografía, Economic History Review, Hispanic American Historical Review, Journal of Economic History, Journal of Economic Literature, Journal of Latin American Studies, Latin American Research Review, Library Quarterly, American Journal of Sociology.

== See also ==
- Robert A. Potash
- Robert N. Burr
