= Kenneth O'Donnell =

American political aide (1924–1977)

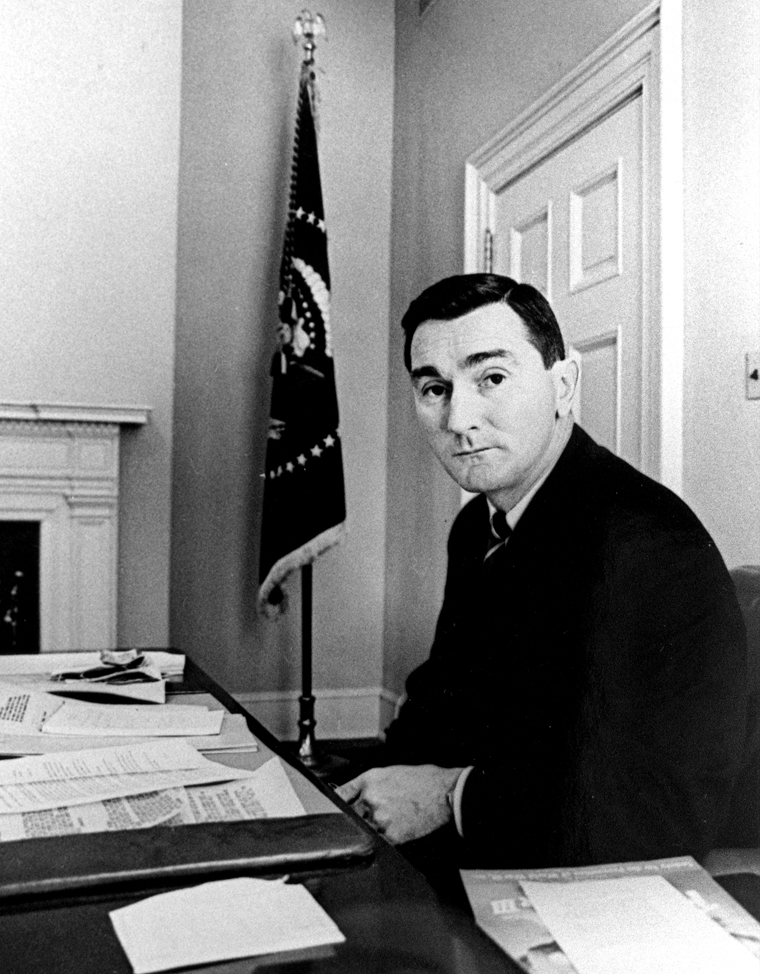

White House Appointments Secretary
- In office January 20, 1961 – November 22, 1963
- President: John F. Kennedy
- Preceded by: Thomas Stephens (Appointments Secretary); Wilton Persons (Chief of Staff)
- Succeeded by: Jack Valenti (Appointments Secretary); Walter Jenkins (Chief of Staff, de facto)

Personal details
- Born: Kenneth Patrick O'Donnell; March 4, 1924 Worcester, Massachusetts, U.S.
- Died: September 9, 1977 (aged 53) Boston, Massachusetts, U.S.
- Resting place: Holyhood Cemetery
- Party: Democratic
- Spouses: Helen Sullivan (m. 1947; died 1977); Asta Steinfatt (m. 1977)
- Children: 5
- Parent: Cleo O'Donnell (father)
- Education: Harvard University (BA); Boston College (LLB)

Military service
- Branch/service: United States Army
- Years of service: 1942–1945
- Unit: United States Army Air Forces
- Battles/wars: World War II

Kenneth Patrick O'Donnell (March 4, 1924 – September 9, 1977) was an American political consultant and the special assistant and appointments secretary to President John F. Kennedy from 1961 until Kennedy's assassination in November 1963. O'Donnell was a good friend of President Kennedy and his younger brother Robert F. Kennedy. O'Donnell, along with Larry O'Brien and David Powers, was part of the group of Kennedy's advisers dubbed the "Irish Mafia".

O'Donnell also served as an aide to President Lyndon B. Johnson from 1963 to 1965. He later served as an adviser to Robert Kennedy's 1968 presidential campaign.

== Early life ==
O'Donnell was born in Worcester, Massachusetts, and raised in Boston. Both of his parents were Roman Catholics of Irish descent. He was the son of Cleo Albert O'Donnell, who was the football coach at the College of the Holy Cross Crusaders for two decades, and later athletics director for all sports activities. O'Donnell's older brother, also named Cleo, was a football celebrity at Harvard University's Harvard College during the 1940s.

O'Donnell graduated from high school during World War II and then served in the U.S. Army Air Forces (1942–1945), where he flew 30 missions as a bombardier in a B-17 squadron before being shot down over Belgium. "He was imprisoned, escaped, and emerged with the Distinguished Flying Cross and Air Medal with Four Oak Leaf Clusters." After the war, he studied at Harvard College (1946–1949) and met Robert F. Kennedy, where they were roommates as well as teammates on the Harvard football team; O'Donnell became team captain in 1948. The two remained good friends until Kennedy's assassination in 1968.

Following graduation from Harvard, O'Donnell attended law school at Boston College from 1950 to 1951. He later worked as a salesman for the Hollingsworth & Vose Paper Company and then the Whitney Corporation, both in Boston, from 1951 to 1952. O'Donnell later worked in public relations from 1952 to 1957.

== Career ==
O'Donnell's friendship with Robert Kennedy resulted in his involvement with the Kennedy family's political careers. In 1946, Robert Kennedy enlisted him to work for the first congressional campaign of his elder brother, John F. Kennedy. In 1952, O'Donnell and Robert Kennedy campaigned together to get John elected to the U.S. Senate. O'Donnell then served as John Kennedy's unpaid political observer in Massachusetts, until 1957, when he became assistant counsel to the Senate Labor Rackets Committee, where he worked for Robert Kennedy, who had been appointed chief counsel of the committee.

In 1958, O'Donnell became a member of Senator John Kennedy's staff, where he was later a major organizer and adviser during Kennedy's presidential campaign in 1960. The next year, he became President Kennedy's special assistant and Appointments Secretary. He later advised the President during the preparation for the Bay of Pigs invasion and during the 1962 Cuban Missile Crisis.

O'Donnell arranged President Kennedy's visit to Dallas in November 1963 and was in a car just behind the president's limousine when Kennedy was assassinated. Kennedy's death was greatly troubling to O'Donnell, who long claimed that he blamed himself for the assassination.

On May 18, 1964, O'Donnell provided testimony to Norman Redlich and Arlen Specter, assistant counsel for the Warren Commission. O'Donnell stated that it was his impression that the shots fired at Kennedy came from the right rear. In their memoir of Kennedy, Johnny, We Hardly Knew Ye, both O'Donnell and David Powers reported hearing only three shots and did not offer any speculation as to their origin. According to a June 15, 1975 report in the Chicago Tribune, an unnamed "Central Intelligence Agency liaison man" told Congressmen that O'Donnell and David Powers had initially told assassination investigators that the shots that struck Kennedy came from a location other than the Texas School Book Depository, but that the two men were convinced, reportedly by FBI Director J. Edgar Hoover or his main aides, to alter their accounts to the Warren Commission to avoid the possibility of revealing the CIA's plots to kill Fidel Castro which might result in an international incident. During a telephone interview, O'Donnell said he testified truthfully and called the allegations "an absolute, outright lie." In his 1987 autobiography Man of the House, former House Speaker Tip O'Neill wrote that he had dinner with O'Donnell and Powers in 1968, and that both men indicated that two shots were fired from behind the fence on the grassy knoll at Dealey Plaza. According to O'Neill, he pointed out to O'Donnell that he gave different information to the Warren Commission, and O'Donnell replied: "I told the FBI what I had heard, but they said it couldn't have happened that way and that I must have been imagining things. So I testified the way they wanted me to. I just didn't want to stir up any more pain and trouble for the family." However, Dave Powers denied such conversation and claim occurred and criticized his autobiography. O'Donnell's son, Kenneth Jr., stated that his father privately called the Warren Commission “the most pointless investigation I’ve ever seen", and that he claimed shots came from two different directions. In the 1970s the House Select Committee on Assassinations reported that both O'Donnell and Robert Kennedy, the Attorney General and brother of the president, had surreptitiously made inquiries to associates about the possibility of organized crime involvement in the assassination.

After serving as a presidential aide to Lyndon Johnson until early 1965, O'Donnell resigned in order to try to win the Democratic nomination for Governor of Massachusetts in 1966. However, he lost by 64,000 votes to Edward McCormack in a race that was much closer than the polls had predicted. In 1968, he served as campaign manager for Robert Kennedy in his bid for the presidency.

Robert Kennedy's assassination in Los Angeles on June 5, 1968, was more devastating to O'Donnell than the assassination of President Kennedy five years earlier. He soon joined, as did many others in Kennedy's campaign, Hubert Humphrey's presidential campaign, serving as campaign manager. In 1970, he made another attempt to win the Democratic nomination for governor, but finished fourth in a field of four Democrats, with just nine percent of the vote.

In 1972, O'Donnell and David Powers co-authored a book about President Kennedy,"Johnny We Hardly Knew Ye": Memories of John Fitzgerald Kennedy.

== Marriages and children ==
While at Harvard, O'Donnell married Helen Sullivan in 1947. They had five children: Kenneth Jr., twins Kathleen and Kevin, Mark and Helen. In January 1977, his wife Helen died of the effects of alcoholism. He remarried soon after that to Asta Hanna Helga Steinfatt, a native of Germany. O'Donnell died a few months later.

== Death ==
During the years after the assassinations of President Kennedy and Robert Kennedy, O'Donnell reportedly became increasingly depressed and began drinking alcohol heavily.

On August 11, 1977, O'Donnell was admitted to Beth Israel Hospital in Boston for a gastrointestinal ailment brought on from the effects of alcoholism. His condition grew progressively worse. He died on September 9 at the age of 53. At the request of O'Donnell's family, no cause of death was announced publicly. O'Donnell's younger daughter, Helen, later attributed her father's death to alcoholism.

On September 12, 1977, a funeral Mass was held at the Blessed Sacrament Roman Catholic Church in Jamaica Plain. Among the attendees were former mayor of Boston John F. Collins, former Speaker of the House John William McCormack, and several members of the Kennedy family, including President Kennedy's widow, Jacqueline Kennedy Onassis.

== Assessments ==
=== Praise ===
In his biography With Kennedy (1966), Pierre Salinger writes:

It was my impression that O'Donnell had the greatest influence in shaping the President's most important decisions. He was able to set aside his own prejudices against individuals and his own ideological commitments (I would rate him a moderate Democrat) and appraise the alternatives with total objectivity. It was impossible to categorize O'Donnell, as White House observers did with other staff members, as either a "hawk" or a "dove" on foreign policy, or a Stevenson liberal or Truman conservative on civil rights. JFK gave extra weight to O'Donnell's opinions because he knew he had no personal cause to argue. Ken had only one criterion: Will this action help or hurt the President? And that, for O'Donnell, was another way of asking: Will it help or hurt the country?

=== Criticism ===
In his autobiography Counselor, Ted Sorensen, who served as special counsel to President Kennedy, claimed that O'Donnell polarized the JFK staff until it became two factions: the professional "politicians" and the academics (such as Sorensen and Arthur Schlesinger). Sorensen also wrote that O'Donnell's antipathy towards him was so great that in 1976/77 he worked to defeat Sorensen's nomination as Director of Central Intelligence for Jimmy Carter.

== Memoir ==
In 1998, William Morrow & Co. published A Common Good: The Friendship of Robert F. Kennedy and Kenneth P. O'Donnell. The memoir was written by O'Donnell's daughter, freelance writer Helen O'Donnell, and chronicles her father's friendship with Robert Kennedy.

== Portrayals ==
- The Missiles of October (1974, TV): played by Stewart Moss.
- Kennedy (1983, TV): played by Trey Wilson.
- JFK (1991): played by David Benn.
- A Woman Named Jackie (1991): played by Clark Gregg.
- Thirteen Days (2000): Movie, played by Kevin Costner
- Jackie Bouvier Kennedy Onassis (2000, TV): played by Brian Wrench.
- Parkland (2013): played by Mark Duplass.
- Killing Kennedy (2013): played by Richard Flood.
- Jackie (2016): played by Aidan O'Hara.
- LBJ (2016): played by Michael Mosley.
- Godfather of Harlem (2019): played by Geoffrey Blake.

== Bibliography ==
- O'Donnell, Helen (1998). A Common Good: The Friendship of Robert F. Kennedy and Kenneth P. O'Donnell. William Morrow & Co. ISBN 978-0-688-14861-4.
- O'Donnell, Kenneth; Powers, David (1972). "Johnny We Hardly Knew Ye": Memories of John Fitzgerald Kennedy. Little, Brown & Co. ISBN 0-316-71625-1.

Political offices
Preceded by Thomas Stephens	White House Appointments Secretary; 1961–1963	Succeeded by Jack Valenti
Preceded by Wilton Persons as White House Chief of Staff	White House Appointments Secretary; 1961–1963	Succeeded by Walter Jenkins; De facto as White House Chief of Staff
