= The Hague Journal of Diplomacy =

Academic journal

- Discipline: International relations
- Language: English
- Edited by: Jan Melissen (Editor-in-Chief)

Publication details
- History: 2006–present
- Publisher: Brill
- Frequency: Quarterly

Standard abbreviations
- ISO 4: Hague J. Dipl.

Indexing
- ISSN: 1871-1901 (print); 1871-191X (web)

Links
- Journal homepage; Online access

The Hague Journal of Diplomacy (HJD) is a peer-reviewed academic journal published quarterly. HJD publishes research on the theory, practice, processes and outcomes of diplomacy in both its traditional state-based forms, as well as contemporary diplomatic expressions practiced by states and non-state entities. Prof. Jan Melissen is the Editor-in-Chief of the Hague Journal of Diplomacy. Prof. Jan Melissen (Leiden University and University of Antwerp) and Prof. Paul Sharp (University of Minnesota, Duluth) are the journal's founding co-editors. Dr. Constance Duncombe (Monash University), Dr. Jérémie Cornut (Simon Fraser University, Vancouver), Dr. Marcus Holmes (The College of William & Mary), Dr. Halvard Leira (Norwegian Institute of International Affairs) and Dr. Deepak Nair (Australian National University) are Associate editors of HJD. Founded in 2005, HJD published its inaugural issue in January 2006. The journal is published by Brill/Nijhoff

== Online presence/online editions ==
HJD's online platform covers additional content, such as blogs, articles, videos, podcasts and other news.

In 2019, HJD launched its blog with Saskia Postema, Caitlin Read and Clothilde Facon as the editors. The Hague Diplomacy Blog intends to stimulate debate on the diplomatic aspect of international politics Sophie Vériter is the HJD book review editor

In 2020, HJD started its podcast series. The HJD podcast is hosted by Ilen Madhavji It aims at bringing the themes of the journal's research off the page, and onto the discussion table. Each episode features a guest who will share their insights as researcher or practitioner of diplomacy

HJD has a presence in social media platforms of Twitter, LinkedIn and Instagram.

== Abstracting and indexing ==
HJD is abstracted and indexed in:

- Current abstracts
- ESCI (Emerging Sources Citation Index)
- ERIH PLUS
- International Bibliography of the Social Sciences, Core
- PAIS International (Public Affairs Information Service), Selective Politics Collection
- Political Science Complete
- SCOPUS
- Social Science Premium Collection
- TOC Premier (Table of Contents)
- Worldwide Political Science Abstracts, Core
