= Robert Dallek =

American historian (born 1934)

- Born: May 16, 1934 (age 92); New York City, U.S.
- Spouse: Geraldine Kronmal (m. 1965)
- Awards: Bancroft Prize (1980)

Academic background
- Education: University of Illinois at Urbana–Champaign; Columbia University

Academic work
- Institutions: Oxford University; University of California, Los Angeles; Columbia University; University of Texas; Dartmouth College; Boston University; Stanford University

Robert A. Dallek (born May 16, 1934) is an American historian specializing in the presidents of the United States, including Franklin D. Roosevelt, John F. Kennedy, Lyndon B. Johnson, and Richard Nixon.

In 2004, he retired as a history professor at Boston University after previously having taught at Columbia University, the University of California, Los Angeles (UCLA), and Oxford University.

He was awarded the Bancroft Prize for his 1979 book Franklin D. Roosevelt and American Foreign Policy, 1932–1945, as well as other awards for scholarship and teaching.

== Early life and education ==
Born in Brooklyn, New York, Dallek is the son of Rubin (a business-machine dealer) and Esther (née Fisher) Dallek. He is Jewish.

Dallek attended the University of Illinois, graduating with a B.A. in history in June 1955. He did graduate work at Columbia University, earning an M.A. in February 1957, and a Ph.D. in June 1964. While working on his Ph.D., he was a history instructor at Columbia.

== Academic career ==
From 1964 until 1994, Dallek advanced from assistant to full professor in the Department of History at University of California at Los Angeles (UCLA). From 1966 to 1968, he was a graduate adviser. From 1972 to 1974, he served as vice chair of the department. From 1981 to 1985, he was a research associate at the Southern California Psychoanalytic Institute. In 1993, he was a visiting professor at the California Institute of Technology, and from 1994 to 1995, he was the Harold Vyvyan Harmsworth Professor of American History at Oxford University, which in 1995 awarded him an honorary M.A.

Since 1996 Dallek has been a visiting professor at the LBJ School of Public Affairs at the University of Texas, and a professor of history at Boston University. From 2004 to 2005 he was Montgomery Fellow and a visiting professor in the history and government departments at Dartmouth College.

Dallek is a member of the Society for Historians of American Foreign Relations.

== An Unfinished Life: John F. Kennedy, 1917-1963 ==
In 2003, Dallek published the New York Times Bestseller An Unfinished Life: John F. Kennedy, 1917-1963, the first major biography of John F. Kennedy in almost 40 years. Based on archival resources and unprecedented access to his medical records, especially those stored at JFK Presidential Library, it revealed his secret struggle with major health problems as well as his love affairs, the backstage role of his father, his appointment of his brother Robert F. Kennedy to the office of United States Attorney General, and speculations about what the president would have done about the Vietnam War if he had lived.

One unintended consequence of the book is that as a result of direct citation of Barbara Gamarekian's oral history interview, one former White House interns, Mimi Alford, was eventually tracked down by the New York Daily News and compelled to release a statement confirming the relationship between her and JFK. Alford later penned her own book, Once Upon a Secret, published in 2012.

== Nixon and Kissinger: Partners in Power ==
In 2007, Dallek published Nixon and Kissinger: Partners in Power, which claims that they were visionaries and cynics at the same time, in an attempt to explain the ups and downs of their diplomatic careers. "The careers of both Nixon and Kissinger reflect the extent to which great accomplishments and public wrongdoing can spring from inner lives." The book was a finalist for the 2008 Pulitzer Prize in History.

== Personal life ==
Dallek married Geraldine Kronmal, a health policy analyst, on August 22, 1965. Their son, Matthew Dallek, is Professor of Political Management at the Graduate School of Political Management at George Washington University.

== Works ==
=== Books ===
External videos
- Booknotes interview with Dallek on Lone Star Rising, September 22, 1991, C-SPAN
- Panel discussion with Dallek on Flawed Giant, May 5, 1998, C-SPAN
- Presentation by Dallek on An Unfinished Life, May 20, 2003, C-SPAN
- Presentation by Dallek and Terry Gollway on Let Every Nation Know, April 15, 2006, C-SPAN
- Q&A interview with Dallek on Nixon and Kissinger, April 29, 2007, C-SPAN
- Interview with Dallek on Nixon and Kissinger, June 10, 2007, C-SPAN
- Presentation by Dallek on Harry S. Truman: The 33rd President, 1945-1953, October 22, 2008, C-SPAN
- Washington Journal interview with Dallek on Harry S. Truman, December 15, 2008, C-SPAN
- Presentation by Dallek on The Lost Peace, October 21, 2010, C-SPAN
- Discussion with Dallek on Camelot's Court, November 6, 2013, C-SPAN
- Q&A interview with Dallek on Camelot's Court, February 2, 2014, C-SPAN
- Presentation by Dallek on Franklin D. Roosevelt: A Political Life, December 5, 2017, C-SPAN

- Democrat and Diplomat: The Life of William E. Dodd (New York: Oxford University Press, 1968)
- 1898: McKinley's Decision – The United States Declares War on Spain (New York: Chelsea House Publishers, 1969)
- The Roosevelt Diplomacy and World War II (New York: Holt, Rinehart and Winston, 1970)
- The Dynamics of World Power: Western Europe (with Robert N. Burr and Walter LaFeber) (New York: Chelsea House Publishers, 1973)
- The Dynamics of World Power: A Documentary History of United States Foreign Policy, 1945-1973 (ed. Arthur M. Schlesinger, Jr., with Robert N. Burr, and Walter LaFeber) (New York: Chelsea House Publishers, 1973)
- Franklin D. Roosevelt and American Foreign Policy, 1932–1945 (New York: Oxford University Press, 1979) (Bancroft Prize)
- The American Style of Foreign Policy: Cultural Politics and Foreign Affairs (New York: Knopf, 1983)
- Ronald Reagan: The Politics of Symbolism (Cambridge, MA: Harvard University Press, 1984) ISBN 978-0-674-77941-9
- Lone Star Rising: Lyndon Johnson and his Times, 1908–1960 (New York: Oxford University Press, 1991)
- Franklin D. Roosevelt as World Leader: An Inaugural Lecture Delivered before the University of Oxford on 16 May 1995 (New York: Clarendon Press, 1995)
- Hail to the Chief: The Making and Unmaking of American Presidents (New York: Hyperion, 1996)
- Flawed Giant: Lyndon Johnson and his Times, 1961–1973 (New York: Oxford University Press, 1998)
- An Unfinished Life: John F. Kennedy, 1917–1963 (Boston: Little, Brown and Company, 2003)
- Lyndon B. Johnson: Portrait of a President (New York: Oxford University Press, 2004)
- Lessons from the Lives and Times of Presidents (Richmond, Virginia: University of Richmond, 2004)
- Let Every Nation Know: John F. Kennedy in His Own Words (with Terry Golway) (Naperville, IL: Sourcebooks, 2006)
- Nixon and Kissinger: Partners in Power (New York: HarperCollins, 2007)
- Harry S. Truman: The 33rd President, 1945-1953 (Times Books, 2008) ISBN 978-0-8050-6938-9
- The Lost Peace: Leadership in a Time of Horror and Hope, 1945–1953 (HarperCollins, 2010) ISBN 978-0-06-162866-5Review in Foreign Affairs
- Camelot's Court: Inside the Kennedy White House (New York: HarperCollins, 2013)
- Franklin D. Roosevelt: A Political Life (New York: Viking, 2017) ISBN 9780525427902

=== Journal articles ===
- "Franklin Roosevelt as world leader". The American Historical Review, 76 (1971): 1503–1513.
- "National mood and American foreign policy: a suggestive essay". American Quarterly, 34 (1982): 229–261.
- "Lyndon Johnson and Vietnam: the making of a tragedy". Diplomatic History, 20 (1996): 147.
- "Tales of the tapes". Reviews in American History, 26 (1998): 333–338.
- "John F. Kennedy's Civil Rights Quandary". American History 38.3 (2003): 36.

=== Essays in edited volumes ===
- American perceptions of the Soviet Union, in Abbott Gleason (ed.), Cold War-Cold Peace: Soviet American Relations, 1933–1983 (Boston: Beacon Press, 1975)
- 'Triumphant America in a shaken world', in Sanford J. Ungar (ed.), Estrangement: America and the World(New York: Oxford University Press, 1985)
- When Presidents Become Weak, in Walter Isaacson (ed.), Profiles in Leadership: Historians on the Elusive Quality of Greatness (New York: W. W. Norton & Company, 2011)

== TV appearances ==
Dallek appeared on The Daily Show in July 2007. He has made numerous appearances on CNN and on public television and radio, including several on-camera comments included the History Channel's JFK: A Presidency Revealed and the American Experience biographies FDR and LBJ.
