= Robert N. Burr =

American historian

- Born: October 15, 1916; Rochester, New York, U.S.
- Died: December 8, 2014 (aged 98)
- Education: University of Rochester; University of Pennsylvania
- Occupation: Historian
- Spouses: Virginia Ward; Elizabeth Evarts
- Children: 1 son, 1 daughter
- Parent(s): John Edwin Burr; Ethel Bills

Robert N. Burr (October 15, 1916 – December 8, 2014) was an American historian. He was a professor of history at the University of California, Los Angeles (UCLA) from 1948 to 1987, where he established the Latin American Studies program and served as its chair department from 1973 to 1977. He was the author of four widely reviewed books about Latin America and the recipient of scholarly awards.

== Early life ==
Robert N. Burr was born on October 15, 1916, in Rochester, New York. His father was John Edwin Burr and his mother, Ethel Bills.

Burr graduated from the University of Rochester. He received a PhD from the University of Pennsylvania.

== Career ==
Burr worked for the General Railway Signal during World War II. He subsequently did contract work for the Brookings Institution.

Burr taught history at Rutgers University from 1946 to 1948. He joined the department of history at the University of California, Los Angeles as a faculty member in 1948, where he established the Latin American Studies program. He also served as the chair of its history department from 1973 to 1978. He subsequently served as the director of UCLA's International Studies and Overseas Programs from 1985 to 1987, when he retired.

Burr was the author of four widely reviewed books and the editor of a fifth book, all about Latin America. His first book, co-authored with UCLA professor Roland D. Hussey, was entitled Documents on Inter-American Cooperation. Published in 1955, it was reviewed by C. G. Fenwick in World Affairs, Harry Bernstein in The Hispanic American Historical Review, Charles C. Griffin in the Pacific Historical Review, and Edwin Lieuwen in The Americas. In 1961, he edited Latin America's Nationalistic Revolutions.

A year later, in 1962, he published his third book, The Stillborn Panama Congress: Power Politics and Chilean-Colombian Relations During the War of the Pacific. It was reviewed by D. A. G. Waddell in The English Historical Review, J. Leon Helguera in The Hispanic American Historical Review, Herbert S. Klein in the Pacific Historical Review, and Terence Tarr in the Pacific Northwest Quarterly.

His fourth book, By Reason or Force: Chile and the Balancing of Power in South America, 1830-1905, was reviewed by John C. Dreier in The Americas, Harold Blakemore in History, Thomas F. McGann in the Pacific Historical Review, W. Donald Beatty in The Hispanic American Historical Review, John J. Johnson in The American Historical Review, Frederic B. Pike in The Americas, and Harry Bernstein in The Annals of the American Academy of Political and Social Science. Moreover, Burr was awarded the Bolton Prize from the Conference on Latin American History for it in 1966.

His fifth book, Our Troubled Hemisphere: Perspectives on United States. Latin American Relations, was reviewed by Donald L. Herman in The Western Political Quarterly, A. Curtis Wilgus in The Annals of the American Academy of Political and Social Science, C. Neale Ronning in the Midwest Journal of Political Science, and John D. Lees in Chatham House's International Affairs.

== Personal life, death and legacy ==
Burr was married twice. He married his first wife, Virginia Ward, in 1940. They had a son and a daughter. They divorced in 1949. Burr married a second time to Elizabeth Evarts in 1952; she predeceased him in 1998. They resided in Los Angeles, California and on Long Island in New York state. Burr died on December 8, 2014.

The chair of UCLA's history department is named in his honor; the current holder, Kevin Terraciano, is the Robert N. Burr Department Chair.

== Works ==
- Burr, Robert N.; Hussey, Roland D. (1955). Documents on Inter-American Cooperation. Philadelphia, Pennsylvania: University of Pennsylvania Press. OCLC 68889918.
- Burr, Robert N., ed. (1961). Latin America's Nationalistic Revolutions. Philadelphia, Pennsylvania: American Academy of Political and Social Science. OCLC 1990672.
- Burr, Robert N. (1962). The Stillborn Panama Congress: Power Politics and Chilean-Colombian Relations During the War of the Pacific. Berkeley, California: University of California Press. OCLC 598314.
- Burr, Robert N. (1965). By Reason or Force: Chile and the Balancing of Power in South America, 1830-1905. Berkeley, California: University of California Press. OCLC 424443.
- Burr, Robert N. (1967). Our Troubled Hemisphere: Perspectives on United States-Latin American Relations. Washington, D.C.: Brookings Institution. OCLC 269748.

== See also ==
- Robert A. Potash
- John Henry Coatsworth
