= I Met a Whore in the Park =

"I Met a Whore in the Park" (a.k.a. "Yo-Ho") is a traditional rugby song that is sung at drink ups after rugby games, or just at gatherings of different rugby teams or players. In traditional rugby songs, one line of the song is sung by an individual person, and then the rest of the people involved in the song repeat that line. The individual person usually changes throughout the group of people singing along with each verse. The song is also quite popular in American drum & bugle corps, where the whole group usually sings in unison, as opposed to the original call and responses format.

This rugby song stays in tune with the standard of one person singing and a chorus following in after. Sometimes one individual will sing the original lines in all the verses instead of changing after each verse. Someone starts singing the song by saying, "I met a whore in the park one day!", then the other individuals say, "Ya ho, ya ho."

== Printed examples ==
- The New Partridge Dictionary of Slang and Unconventional English (2006)

== Recorded examples ==
- Sung by Doug Clark & the Hot Nuts Hell Night LP (c1967)
- Untitled example This version is sung by female rugby players and uploaded on April 2, 2007.
- "I met a whore in the Park one day" As sung by rugby players and uploaded on May 5, 2008.
