= Faye Ringel =

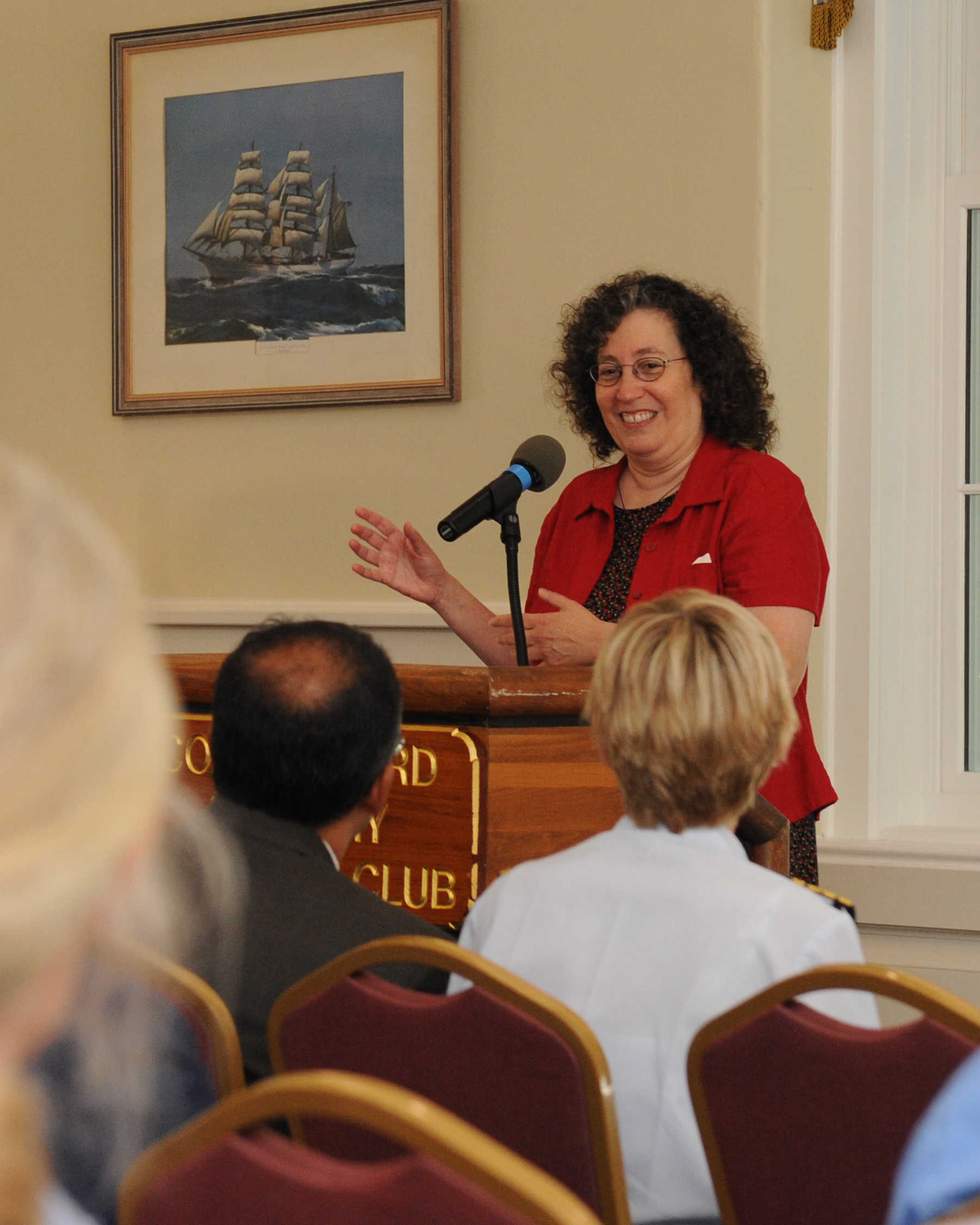
Faye Ringel 2010

Faye J. Ringel is an American professor emeritus of Humanities at the United States Coast Guard Academy and an author.

== Life ==
Ringel received a Bachelor of Arts in Comparative Literature from Brandeis University and a Ph.D. from Brown University in Comparative Literature with Patterns of the Hero and the Quest in 1979. She is also a performer and teacher of traditional music (Hot Chestnuts: Old Songs, Endearing Charms).

Ringel was promoted to professor emeritus at the United States Coast Guard Academy after 20 years of service in 2010.

== Private life ==
She married Paul Hazel, a novelist, in 1990 but later was divorced.

== Work ==
- Faye Ringel, New England's Gothic Literature: History and Folklore of the Supernatural (1995)
- Hot Chestnuts
