= Portrait of a President =

1962 book by William Manchester

- First edition cover
- Author: William Manchester
- Subject: John F. Kennedy
- Genre: Biography
- Publisher: Little, Brown
- Publication date: 1962
- Publication place: United States
- Dewey Decimal: 973.922092
- LC Class: E842 .M3

Portrait of a President (1962) is William Manchester's description of U.S. President John F. Kennedy. It was based on Manchester's 1962 Holiday magazine article.
