= American Caesar (book) =

1978 biography of Douglas MacArthur by William Manchester

- First edition
- Author: William Manchester
- Language: English
- Subject: Biography
- Genre: Non-fiction
- Publisher: Little, Brown and Company
- Publication date: September 30, 1978
- Publication place: United States
- Pages: 793
- ISBN: 9780316544986

American Caesar: Douglas MacArthur, 1880–1964 is a 1978 biography of General of the Army Douglas MacArthur by American historian William Manchester.

Manchester paints a sympathetic but balanced portrait of MacArthur, praising the general for his military accomplishments, administrative skill, and personal bravery, while criticizing his vanity, paranoia, and tendency toward insubordination. As the title suggests, Manchester's central thesis is that MacArthur was an analogue of Julius Caesar, a proposition he supports by comparing their intellectual capacity, brilliant strategic generalship, political ambition, magnanimity as conquerors, and propensity for hubris.

It was made into a series in 1983 hosted by John Huston.
