= Johnny, We Hardly Knew Ye (book) =

1972 memoir

- Original paper back cover
- Author: Kenneth O'Donnell; David Powers; Joe McCarthy
- Language: English
- Subject: Assassination of John F. Kennedy
- Publisher: Little, Brown and Company
- Publication date: September 1972
- Publication place: United States
- Media type: Paperback
- Pages: 434 pages
- ISBN: 0316630004

"Johnny, We Hardly Knew Ye": Memories of John Fitzgerald Kennedy is a 1972 memoir of John F. Kennedy, written by two of his closest friends and advisors, David Powers and Kenneth O'Donnell, in collaboration with journalist Joe McCarthy. The book was a best-seller and was later adapted into a television movie of the same title in 1977.
