= The Death of a President =

1967 book by William Manchester

The Death of a President: November 20–November 25, 1963
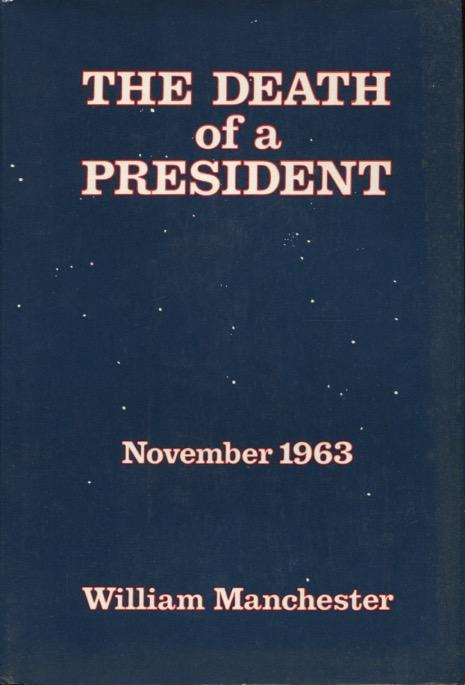
- First edition
- Author: William Manchester
- Language: English
- Publisher: Harper & Row; Little, Brown and Company (2013 reissue)
- Publication date: 1967
- Publication place: United States
- Media type: Print
- Pages: 781 pp (first edition)
- OCLC: 475124
- Dewey Decimal: 973.922/0924
- LC Class: E842.9 .M28 1967a

The Death of a President: November 20–November 25, 1963 is historian William Manchester's 1967 account of the assassination of United States President John F. Kennedy. The book gained public attention before it was published when Kennedy's widow Jacqueline, who had initially asked Manchester to write the book, demanded that the author make changes in the manuscript.

== Description ==
The book is dedicated: "For all in whose hearts he still lives—a watchman of honor who never sleeps".

The book chronicles several days in late November 1963, from a small reception the Kennedys hosted in the White House on Wednesday, November 20, the evening before the visit to Dallas, Texas, through the flight to Texas, the motorcade, the assassination, the hospital, the airplane journey back to Washington, D.C., and the funeral on Monday, November 25. The tension between the Kennedy and Johnson factions, the worldwide reaction, and Lee Harvey Oswald's televised murder by Jack Ruby are discussed in painstaking detail.

== Background ==
=== Genesis ===
During early 1964, Jacqueline Kennedy commissioned Manchester to produce an account of the assassination. She and the Kennedy family wanted a definitive telling of the events to preempt other books, including Jim Bishop's forthcoming The Day Kennedy Was Shot. Kennedy was familiar with Manchester's work through Portrait of a President: John F. Kennedy in Profile, his account of the president's first year and a half as president. Manchester had met and grown to admire John Kennedy when both were recovering from war wounds in Boston.

The agreement stipulated that Jacqueline Kennedy and the president's brother Robert F. Kennedy, then Attorney General, would approve the manuscript. As part of the agreement, Manchester was to receive an advance of $36,000 but only against the income from the first printing. All other earnings would go to the John F. Kennedy Library.

Kennedy promised Manchester exclusive interviews with members of the family, and sat for 10 hours of interviews with him. Manchester interviewed 1,000 people for the book, including Robert F. Kennedy; only Marina Oswald refused. Working 100 hours a week for two years to meet an accelerated 1967 publishing deadline, the stress of producing the book sent Manchester to a hospital due to nervous exhaustion for more than two months, where he completed a manuscript of 1,201 pages and 380,000 words.

Manchester gave the manuscript to his editor at Harper & Row, Evan Thomas, and to the Kennedy family for review during March 1966. He received an offer of $665,000 from Look magazine for serial rights; his agent had obtained an agreement that payments for a serial would go to the author.

=== Controversy ===
Both Jacqueline and Robert F. Kennedy had refused to read the manuscript, delegating the review to former Kennedy administration members John Seigenthaler, Ed Guthman, and Richard N. Goodwin. They believed that passages in the book "unflattering" to John might damage Robert Kennedy's political plans for 1968, and requested changes. Pam Turnure, Jacqueline Kennedy's secretary, also read the manuscript; alarmed by many "personal revelations" from Jacqueline's interviews with Manchester, such as the fact that she smoked cigarettes (something Jacqueline Kennedy had hidden in the White House), she also provided lists of changes. Additionally, Jacqueline Kennedy believed that the proceeds from the Look offer should go to the Kennedy Library. She claimed that her interviews with Manchester had been intended for the library, threatened to block publication of the book unless the changes were made, unsuccessfully offered Look $1 million to cancel the serialization, and during late 1966, filed a lawsuit asking the court to issue an injunction to stop the book's publication.

Newspaper articles about her decision speculated on the contents of the book. Through an out-of-court settlement during January 1967, Manchester agreed to delete 1,600 words from the serialization and seven out of 654 pages from the published book. Although headlines noted Jacqueline Kennedy as the victor, Manchester claimed that the deletions were "harmless", and retained the serialization fee.

=== Aftermath ===
Harper & Row published The Death of a President during the spring of 1967 to good reviews. It sold more than 1 million copies by summer and later was given the Dag Hammarskjold International Literary Prize. By 1970 the book had earned $1 million in royalties for the Kennedy Library.

During 1988, the book was reprinted and Manchester wrote a new foreword. People had wondered whether he would update and modify his original work. Manchester wrote that, in his opinion, there were not any new developments.

The Kennedy family retains control of materials related to Death. Jacqueline Kennedy's interview tapes with the author are sealed at the Kennedy Library until 2067. Manchester's original manuscript is held at Wesleyan University with "extremely restricted use" and, according to his son John Manchester, the Kennedy family allowed the book to go out of print.

== Reprints ==
The book was reprinted during 1988, and reissued by Back Bay Books, an imprint of Little, Brown, and Company, during October 2013. ISBN 0316370711

== See also ==
- The Parts Left Out of the Kennedy Book hoax by Paul Krassner
