= William Manchester =

American author, journalist and historian (1922–2004)

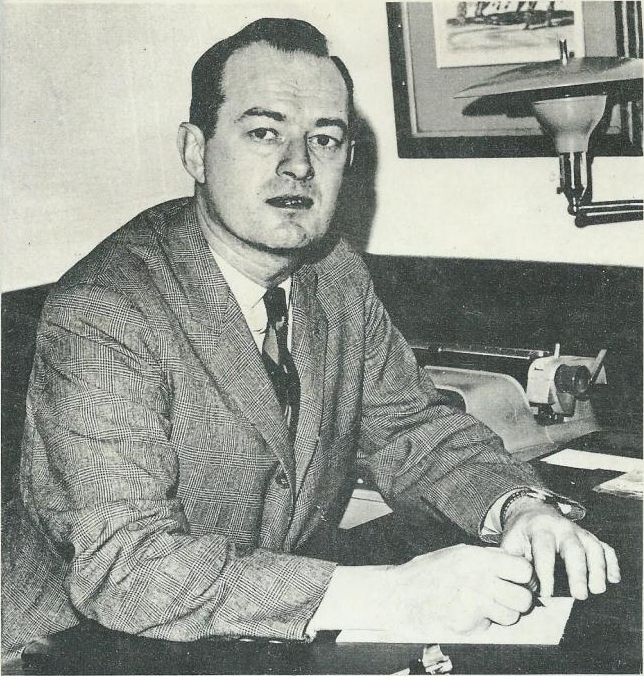
- Manchester in c. 1967
- Born: William Raymond Manchester; April 1, 1922; Attleboro, Massachusetts, U.S.
- Died: June 1, 2004 (aged 82); Middletown, Connecticut, U.S.
- Resting place: Indian Hill Cemetery in Middletown, Connecticut, U.S.
- Education: Massachusetts State College (BA); University of Missouri (MA)
- Occupations: Historian; biographer; professor
- Writing career
- Notable works: American Caesar: Douglas MacArthur 1880–1964, The Death of a President, The Last Lion: Winston Spencer Churchill
- Military career
- Allegiance: United States
- Branch: United States Marine Corps
- Rank: Sergeant
- Units: 6th Marine Division
- Conflicts: World War II; Volcano and Ryukyu Islands campaign; Battle of Okinawa

Signature
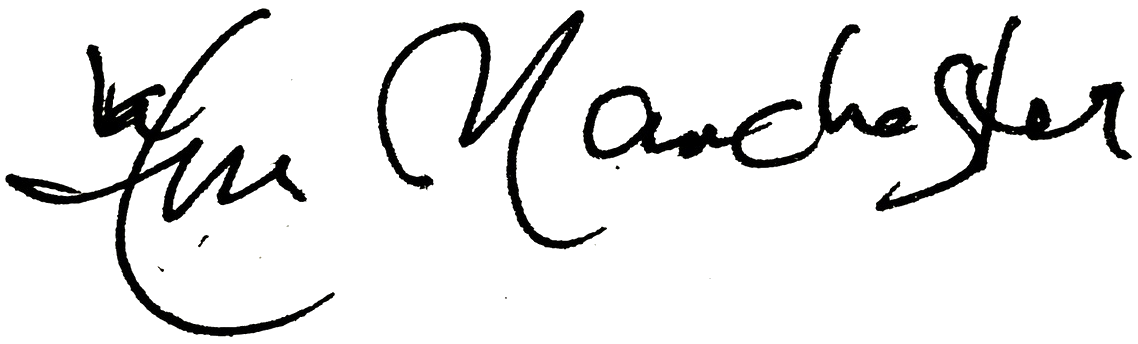

William Raymond Manchester (April 1, 1922 – June 1, 2004) was an American author, biographer, and historian. He was the author of 18 books which have been translated into over 20 languages. He was awarded the National Humanities Medal and the Abraham Lincoln Literary Award.

== Early life and education ==
Manchester was born in Attleboro, Massachusetts, and grew up in Springfield, Massachusetts. His father served in the U.S. Marine Corps during World War I.

After his father's death and the Japanese attack on Pearl Harbor, Manchester likewise enlisted in the Marine Corps. However, he was ordered back to college until called up. Initially, Manchester joined the Officer Candidate School but was dropped before receiving a commission. After being given the rank of corporal, he was sent to Guadalcanal in 1944 for further training. Although he had expected to serve in Europe, Manchester ultimately found himself in the Pacific Theater. He served in the Battle of Okinawa, was severely wounded on June 5, 1945, and was promoted to sergeant in July and awarded the Purple Heart.

Following World War II, Manchester worked as a copyboy for the Daily Oklahoman in 1945 before returning to college. In 1946, he completed his B.A. from Massachusetts State College, where he was a member of the Lambda Chi Alpha fraternity. In 1947, he earned his master's degree from the University of Missouri.

== Career ==
=== Journalism ===
In 1947, Manchester went to work as a reporter for The Baltimore Sun, where he met journalist H. L. Mencken, who became his friend and mentor, and also became the subject of Manchester's master's thesis and first book, Disturber of the Peace. The biography, published in 1951, profiles Mencken, the self-described "conservative anarchist" who made his mark as a writer, editor, and political pundit in the 1920s. In 1953, Manchester published his novel The City of Anger, set in Baltimore and dealing with inner city life and the numbers racket, subjects Manchester had learned about as a big city reporter.

=== Academia ===
In 1955, Manchester became an editor for Wesleyan University and the Wesleyan University Press and spent the rest of his career at the university. For the academic year 1959–1960, he was a Fellow on the faculty at the Center for Advanced Studies of Wesleyan. He later became an adjunct professor of history, adjunct professor emeritus, and writer-in-residence at the university. During his association with Wesleyan University, Manchester developed an intense writing regimen that he adhered to for much of his life, often writing nonstop for up to 50 hours at a time. He described the experience as follows: "I would work all day, all night, all the next day, all the following night and into the third day. I would look up at the clock, and it would be 3:30 in the afternoon, and I would say, 'Oh boy, I've got three more hours to write.' I just loved it."

=== Author ===
Manchester's wartime experiences formed the basis for his very personal account of the Pacific Theater, Goodbye, Darkness: A Memoir of the Pacific War. In this memoir, Manchester used personal anecdotes from his service on Okinawa in his descriptions of battles on Guadalcanal, Tarawa, and Saipan. Manchester's portrayal of his wartime service, his section in combat, and his injuries are literary devices. He stated this in the end notes, as well as denying any attempt at a chronological account. Later examination of his personal papers, his wartime record, and his medical records show that much of what he recounted was inaccurate.

Manchester also wrote of World War II in several other books, including a three-part biography, The Last Lion, of Winston Churchill. Manchester also wrote a biography of General Douglas MacArthur, American Caesar.

His best-selling book, The Death of a President (1967), is a detailed account of the assassination of United States President John F. Kennedy, who had been the subject of an earlier book by Manchester. In 1964, Manchester was commissioned by the Kennedy family to write the book. Manchester, who retraced the movements of President Kennedy and Lee Harvey Oswald before the assassination, tentatively concluded, based on his study of Oswald's psychology and their similar training as Marine sharpshooters, that Oswald had acted alone. Manchester had the support of Robert and Jacqueline Kennedy, but later had a falling-out with Robert over Manchester's treatment of President Lyndon B. Johnson.

Before the book could be published, Jacqueline Kennedy filed a lawsuit to prevent its publication, even though she had previously authorized it. The suit was settled in 1967, reportedly with Manchester's agreeing to drop certain passages dealing with details of Kennedy's family life. In response satirist Paul Krassner published a piece entitled "The Parts That Were Left Out of the Kennedy Book", which imagined scandalous censored material. In his collection of essays Controversy (1977), Manchester detailed Kennedy's attempts to suppress the book. The book was a best-seller at release, but was allowed to go out of print until 1988. It was re-issued in October 2013.

Following the death of his wife in 1998, Manchester suffered two strokes. Manchester told his publishers that he would not be able to complete the planned third volume of his three part-biography of Churchill, The Last Lion: Winston Spencer Churchill: Defender of the Realm, 1940-1965. Manchester was initially reluctant to collaborate with anyone to finish the work, but in October 2003, he asked Paul Reid, a friend and writer for The Palm Beach Post, to complete the Churchill biography. After Manchester's death, Reid completed the third volume using Manchester's notes and writing.

== Awards ==
In 2001, President George W. Bush presented Manchester with the National Humanities Medal. In an interview conducted with a writer who was preparing capsule biographies of NEH medal recipients, Manchester stated that he had been valedictorian of his class at the University of Massachusetts and that he had received the Navy Cross, the Silver Star, and two Purple Hearts; however, a 2017 article in the intellectual review The American Spectator asserted that none of this was true.

Manchester was also the recipient of the Abraham Lincoln Literary Award, among other awards.

== Personal life ==
Manchester married Julia Brown Marshall (known as Judy) on March 27, 1948. They had one son, music composer John, and two daughters, Julie and Laurie.

== Death ==
Manchester died at the age of 82 on June 1, 2004, and is interred at Indian Hill Cemetery in Middletown, Connecticut.

== Bibliography ==
- Disturber of the Peace: The Life of H.L. Mencken (1951)
- The City of Anger, a novel. (1953)
- Shadow of the Monsoon (1956)
- A Rockefeller Family Portrait, from John D. to Nelson (1959)
- Beard the Lion (Cairo Intrigue), a novel (1959)
- The Long Gainer, a novel (1961)
- Portrait of a President, John F. Kennedy in profile (1962, 1967)
- The Death of a President: November 20–25 (1967)
- The Arms of Krupp: The Rise and Fall of the Industrial Dynasty that Armed Germany at War (1968)
- The Glory and the Dream: A Narrative History of America, 1932–1972 (1974)
- Controversy and other essays in journalism (1976)
- American Caesar: Douglas MacArthur 1880–1964 (1978)
- On Mencken, essays (1980)
- Goodbye, Darkness: A Memoir of the Pacific War (1980)
- One Brief Shining Moment: Remembering Kennedy (1983)
- The Last Lion: Winston Spencer Churchill: Visions of Glory, 1874–1932 (1983)
- "Okinawa: The Bloodiest...", an essay. (1987)
- The Last Lion: Winston Spencer Churchill: Alone 1932–1940 (1988)
- In Our Time: The World as Seen by Magnum Photographers. New York; London: W W Norton & Co Inc, 1989. ISBN 0-393-02767-8. With essays by Manchester ("Images: a Wide Angle"), Jean Lacouture ("The Founders") and Fred Ritchin ("What is Magnum?"), and "Biographical Notes and Selected Bibliographies" and "Bibliography and Chronology of Magnum" by Stuart Alexander.
- A World Lit Only by Fire: The Medieval Mind and the Renaissance—Portrait of an Age (1992) ISBN 0-316-54556-2
- Magellan (1994)
- No End Save Victory (2001)
- The Last Lion: Winston Spencer Churchill: Defender of the Realm, 1940–1965 (2012) (with co-author Paul Reid)
