= An Unfinished Life: John F. Kennedy, 1917–1963 =

2003 book by Robert Dallek

- First edition
- Author: Robert Dallek
- Subject: Life and assassination of John F. Kennedy
- Genre: Biography
- Publisher: Little, Brown
- Publication date: 2003
- Pages: 838
- ISBN: 9780713998030

An Unfinished Life: John F. Kennedy, 1917–1963 is a 2003 biography of the 35th president of the United States, John F. Kennedy (JFK), who was assassinated in 1963. It was written by Bancroft Prize-winning historian Robert Dallek, a professor of history at Boston University. Dallek is a presidential historian who previously taught at Columbia University and UCLA, and who had already written nearly two dozen books. Dallek researched Kennedy for five years, using National Security Archives, oral histories, White House tapes, and medical records. Dallek contends that historians have underestimated JFK's achievements, especially in regards to his accomplishments in foreign policy, including his averting nuclear war during the Cuban Missile Crisis and his early steps towards detente with the Soviet Union, which began with his Partial Nuclear Test Ban Treaty in August 1963.

Kennedy was part of a prominent Boston family that would acquire great wealth and had held political office for two prior generations. The death of JFK's older brother Joseph P. Kennedy Jr. during World War II eventually paved the way for his political career. His wealthy diplomat father Joseph P. Kennedy was heavily involved in his political career, and both helped to finance his campaigns, and arrange effective public relations efforts through his contacts in the press and other media. Other family members, particularly his brother Robert, helped in early campaign efforts. In the mid-1950s, after defeating Henry Cabot Lodge Jr., leaving the United States House of Representatives, and getting elected as a U.S. Senator, JFK was one step closer to becoming president.

Dallek recounts Kennedy's medical problems which were controlled by drugs including antispasmodics and antibiotics. He used painkillers for his chronic back pain and other medication to treat his Addison's disease. He sometimes took up to eight medications a day. A committee of three Kennedy associates refused to provide his medical records for decades, but they decided to give Dallek access to them; although the book does not have a complete record of his medical history.

== Critical reviews ==
The Independent has stated that earlier works about Kennedy were unimpressive. Subsequent books have variously cast him as a saint, or were prone to excessive gossip, and a few were written as vendettas for political or personal reasons. The review notes that Dallek "re-examines Kennedy's responses to the American civil rights movement, his perception of the threat to national defense and economic interests at various times, his diplomacy, and his standing as a Great Democrat".

The Independent review further notes, "One recalls a Thomas Jefferson letter to John Adams in 1813, agreeing 'that there is a natural aristocracy among men. The grounds of this are virtue and talents.... There is also an artificial aristocracy founded on wealth and birth, without either virtue or talents.' This book, in my view, puts John Kennedy somewhere in between."

A review by Best Presidential Biographies, notes that the author's access to previously unpublished Kennedy documents was both a boon for history buffs, but a problem for those who cringe from embarrassing or overly intrusive personal information. The review notes "Dallek was granted almost unprecedented access to Kennedy family documents including newly-revealed information relating to JFK’s seemingly endless array of medical ailments. Dallek also convinced a former Kennedy administration press aide to release new information concerning an affair between JFK and a White House intern". Both gossips and history buffs will be intrigued by the volume, but some may find the sudden unveiling of formerly personal information about Kennedy intrusive. The review stresses the most compelling sections are "those dealing with Kennedy’s relationship with Nikita Khrushchev (their meeting at the Vienna Summit, in particular) and the Bay of Pigs debacle". On a down note, many will find the litany of Kennedy's medical ailments far too pervasive in the volume.

In a review in Bookreporter, David Exum notes that "Dallek... examines how Kennedy's father did all he could and used all of his financial muscle to ... get his son elected as senator" and that the "most interesting and stark examinations of Dallek's biography is the involvement JFK's father had in his son's political career". Joseph Kennedy's wealth which he used in concert with his knowledge of public relations and his connections in the press certainly smoothed the way for his son's close victory in his first race for the Senate, but Kennedy, under the management of his brother Robert began campaigning months earlier than his opponent Henry Cabot Lodge Jr., scored well in two late campaign televised debates, and through the use of teas often attended by his mother and sisters, reached approximately 70,000 women voters who may not have formerly been as engaged in politics. Robert also organized 286 Kennedy secretaries, who had no previous political allegiance to the state Democratic party, to interface with party officials, and an impressive total of around twenty thousand volunteers.

The author of the Bookreporter review also noted that Dallek concluded that Kennedy's many affairs could be attributed to Rose Kennedy's inadequacies in bringing up her second son. Rose Kennedy, in withholding physical affection from her children was acting in concert with the child psychologists of the period. The widely read authority on parenting young children, L. Emmet Holt, "warned mothers against coddling children or playing with them or displaying a lot of affection with them." Joseph Kennedy, rather, in the frequency of his own affairs and by encouraging his male children to have frequent trysts themselves likely had a larger influence in Kennedy's choice to engage in frequent marital infidelities, though Kennedy may have benefitted from peers or organizations that impressed him with the benefits of marital fidelity and more discretion and restraint in his romantic encounters. David Exum considers Dallek's book an excellent rating, despite his reservations and writes that the novel "pushes aside all the myths surrounding JFK and presents his subject like a true historian" and "should be considered the finest biography ever written about the slain statesman".

In a 2013 interview with Dallek, journalist Chris Lydon wrote that Americans still connect with the memory of Kennedy because "he stared down a very possible nuclear catastrophe" and that "he broke the nuclear madness of 50 years ago with his melancholy realism about war". These two accomplishments and his personality may have been what made him one of the more admired Presidents of the 20th century, as many polls indicate, and Dallek's skill at depicting these traits provides the reader with the real substance of Kennedy's legacy.
