= Atlantic Council =

American Atlanticist think tank founded in 1961

- Atlantic Council of the United States

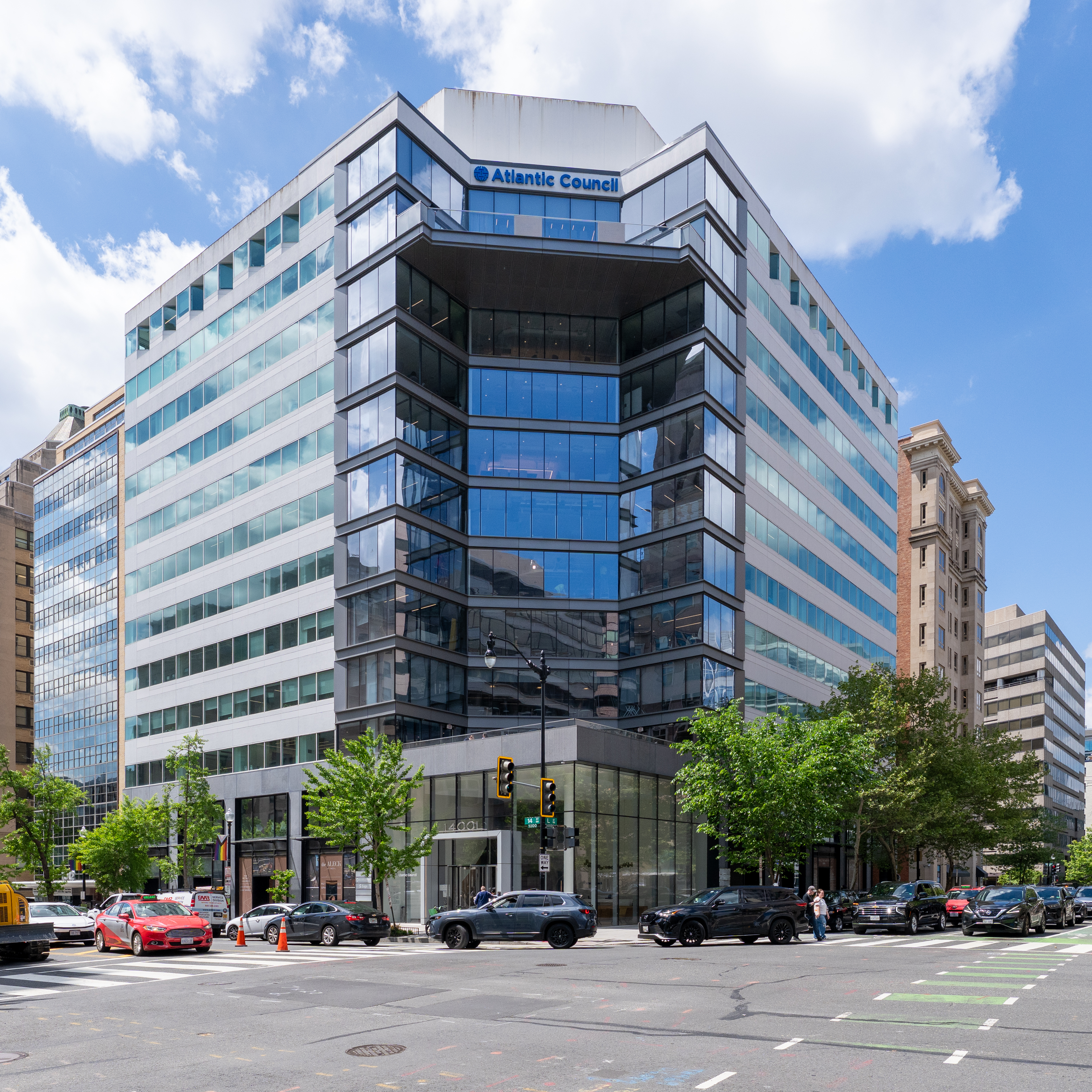
- Formation: 1961; 65 years ago
- Type: International affairs think tank
- Tax ID no.: 52-0742294
- Legal status: 501(c)(3)
- Purpose: Atlanticism
- Location: Washington, DC, US
- Chairman: John F. W. Rogers
- President and CEO: Frederick Kempe
- Revenue: $68,020,533 (2019)
- Expenses: $32,590,683 (2019)
- Employees: 197 (2019)
- Website: atlanticcouncil.org

The Atlantic Council is an American think tank in the field of international affairs, favoring Atlanticism, founded in 1961 by Christian Herter and William L. Clayton. It manages sixteen regional centers and functional programs related to international security and global economic prosperity. It is headquartered in Washington, DC, and is a member of the Atlantic Treaty Association.

The Atlantic Council was founded with the stated mission of encouraging continued cooperation between North America and Europe following World War II. Its early work focused particularly on transatlantic economic cooperation and free trade, as well as maintaining connections among policymakers in Europe and North America. Its activities subsequently expanded beyond the transatlantic relationship to other regions and a broader range of foreign policy issues.

The Council describes itself as nonpartisan and is, by charter, independent of the United States government and NATO. It has received funding from foundations, corporations, individuals, and governments.

== History ==
The Atlantic Council was founded with the stated mission to encourage the continuation of cooperation between North America and Europe that began after World War II. In its early years, its work consisted largely of publishing policy papers and polling Europeans and Americans about their attitudes towards transatlantic and international cooperation. Its primary focus at that time was on economic issues—mainly encouraging free trade between the two continents, and to a lesser extent to the rest of the world—but it also did some work on political and environmental issues.

Although the Atlantic Council did publish policy papers and monographs, Melvin Small of Wayne State University wrote that, especially in its early years, the council's real strength lay in its connections to influential policymakers. The Council early on found a niche as "center for informal get-togethers" of leaders from both sides of the Atlantic, with members working to develop "networks of continuing communication".

The Atlantic Council also works outside Europe and the US. It was among the first organizations advocating for an increased Japanese presence in the international community. Its Asian programs have expanded since 2001 as a consequence of the war in Afghanistan leading to the opening of its South Asia Center and Program on Asia. Climate change, and coordinating with India and China on these issues, were also a factor in this development.

In February 2009, James L. Jones, then-chairman of the Atlantic Council, stepped down to serve as President Obama's new National Security Advisor and was succeeded by Senator Chuck Hagel. In addition, other Council members also left to serve the administration: Susan Rice as ambassador to the UN, Richard Holbrooke as the Special Representative to Afghanistan and Pakistan, General Eric K. Shinseki as the Secretary of Veterans Affairs, and Anne-Marie Slaughter as Director of Policy Planning at the State Department. Four years later, Hagel stepped down to serve as US Secretary of Defense. Gen. Brent Scowcroft served as interim chairman of the organization's Board of Directors until January 2014, when former ambassador to China and governor of Utah Jon Huntsman Jr. was appointed.

They expanded their efforts to Central and South America in 2013 when the Atlantic Council launched the Adrienne Arsht Latin America Center, named for Adrienne Arsht, a philanthropist and businesswoman who helped fund its creation through a $5 million gift. The goal of the center was to improve relationships and economic ties between Latin American countries, North America and Europe. Their first director was Peter Schechter, who was chosen due to his extensive experience acting as a lead consultant on elections, polling, advertising, and media relations in the region. As of October 2023, the Adrienne Arsht Latin American Center at the Atlantic Council has increased its influence across the Latin American region. With a focus on achieving greater socioeconomic prosperity, the center has integrated political economy issues into policy-making and fostered collaboration with a diverse range of stakeholders, including governments, companies, and multilateral institutions.

The Digital Forensic Research Lab was founded in 2016, to study disinformation in open source environments and report on democratic processes. Facebook helped fund the think tank's project in 2018, after donating a significant but undisclosed sum that placed it among top donors to the organization, such as the government of Great Britain. The Atlantic Council also operates the Cyber Statecraft Initiative, which conducts research on cybersecurity, cyber conflict, emerging technologies, and international cyber policy. The initiative conducts research on issues including cloud security, offensive cyber capabilities, technology governance, cyber resilience, and organizes the annual Cyber 9/12 Strategy Challenge. In 2017, Tom Bossert, previously a Nonresident Zurich Cyber Risk Fellow at the Atlantic Council's Cyber Security Initiative, was appointed Homeland Security Advisor to the Trump administration.

In 2019, the Atlantic Council entered into a partnership with the Hungary Foundation, a group funded by the Orbán government in Hungary. A series of strategy discussions was planned which would have included key US and Central Europe officials. In a meeting in Budapest that year, Atlantic Council members criticized Hungarian Foreign Ministry officials for limiting discussion of the state of democracy in Hungary. Following this, the Hungary Foundation canceled the project. In 2020, the Atlantic Council returned a grant from the Hungary Foundation and ended its relationship with the Foundation.

In a keynote event with ECB President Christine Lagarde, the Atlantic Council GeoEconomics Center was launched in December 2020. The GeoEconomics Center develops data-driven programs, publications, and thought leadership at the nexus of economics, finance, and foreign policy. The Center aims to bridge the divide between these siloed sectors with the goal of helping shape a more resilient global economy. The center is organized around three pillars: the Future of Capitalism, the Future of Money, and the Economic Statecraft Initiative. They produce cutting-edge data visualizations and research on a range of issues including digital currencies, China's economy, sanctions, and the future of the Bretton Woods system. The center has hosted a range of leading financial policymakers for major policy speeches including Brian Deese, Ngozi Okonjo-Iweala, Janet Yellen, Gina Raimondo, Kristalina Georgieva, David Malpass, and many more.

In September 2021, the Global China Hub was founded to research three challenges posed by China's economic growth: China's growing influence on countries, global institutions, and democratic values; the global ramifications of political and economic change in Xi Jinping's China; and China's drive to dominate emerging technologies and the consequences for individual rights and privacy. As of June 2023, its senior director is David O. Shullman, who also leads the Atlantic Council's China-related work. During the Russo-Ukrainian war, the Atlantic Council was the think tank most often cited by the top three US newspapers in relation with that war. It supported the shipment of Western weapons to Ukraine as well as attacks on Russian cities to destroy their critical infrastructure, while rejecting any compromise with the Russian government.

Between 2025 and 2026, the Atlantic Council expanded several policy initiatives and research programs. In 2025, it launched the ReForge Commission, an initiative focused on defense industrial capacity, military production, and transatlantic security cooperation; the GeoTech Commission on Artificial Intelligence, focused on artificial intelligence policy and US competitiveness; and the N7 Research Institute, a policy center established through the Council's N7 Initiative in partnership with the Jeffrey M. Talpins Foundation to promote cooperation among the US, Israel, and Arab and Muslim-majority countries. The Council also launched the MENA Futures Lab within its Rafik Hariri Center for the Middle East and established the Daniel B. Poneman Chair for Nuclear Energy Policy. In 2026, the organization launched a task force on Reimagining European Defense and Innovation focused on European defense modernization and emerging technologies. In the same year, physician and public health expert Raj Panjabi joined the Bipartisan Commission on Biodefense at the Council's Scowcroft Center for Strategy and Security as a commissioner.

== Connections and funding ==
Since its inception, the Atlantic Council has stated it is a nonpartisan institution, with members "from the moderate internationalist wings of both parties" in the United States. Despite its connections, the council is by charter independent of the US government and NATO, a registered 501(c)(3) nonprofit organization. In September 2014, Eric Lipton reported in The New York Times that since 2008, the US organization had received donations from more than twenty-five foreign governments. He wrote that the Atlantic Council was one of a number of think tanks that received substantial overseas funds and conducted activities that "typically align with the foreign governments' agendas".

The Atlantic Council's Rafik Hariri Center for the Middle East was established with a donation from Bahaa Hariri and its founding head was Michele Dunne. After Mohamed Morsi was removed as President of Egypt by the military in 2013, Dunne urged the United States to suspend military aid to Egypt and called Morsi's removal a "military coup". Bahaa Hariri complained to the Atlantic Council about Dunne's actions and four months later Dunne resigned her position. In 2014, the Atlantic Council produced a report promoting the Transatlantic Trade and Investment Partnership (TTIP) — a proposed trade-accommodation agreement between the European Union and the US — with the financial backing of FedEx, who were simultaneously lobbying Congress directly to decrease transatlantic tariffs.

In 2015 and 2016, the three largest donors, giving over US$1 million each, were US millionaire Adrienne Arsht (executive vice chair, Lebanese billionaire Bahaa Hariri (estranged brother of Lebanese Prime Minister Saad Hariri), and the United Arab Emirates. The Ukrainian oligarch-run Burisma Holdings donated $100,000 per year for three years to the Atlantic Council starting in 2016. The full list of financial sponsors includes many military, financial, and corporate concerns. The leading donors in 2018 were Facebook and the British government. According to the council, of its 2019 revenue, 14% (approximately $5.5 million) came from government donors excluding the US government. In 2021, the founding donor was Adrienne Arsht, and donors giving more than $1 million were the American Securities Foundation, Bahaa Hariri, Embassy of the United Arab Emirates, Facebook, Goldman Sachs, The Rockefeller Foundation, and the UK Foreign, Commonwealth and Development Office.

In November 2022, the Atlantic Council hosted the Global Food Security Forum, which was co-hosted with the Gaurav and Sharon Srivastava Family Foundation, run by Gaurav Srivastava. The Atlantic Council subsequently terminated its relationship with Srivastava "after it could not verify important details of his background" following reporting of the Guarav Srivastava Fake Spy Scam. A Spokesperson for the Atlantic Council told Politico that it had returned funds received in 2023 for future collaboration, and that it "made the decision to terminate our relationship with Mr Srivastava in May 2023 upon learning new information because of our donor review process. For example, we learned that The Gaurav & Sharon Srivastava Family Foundation was not established 501(c)(3) in April of 2023, despite Mr Srivastava's representation to the Council that this was a registered foundation."

In 2025, the Quincy Institute for Responsible Statecraft reported that the Atlantic Council had the highest recorded total of funding by foreign governments of any US-based think tank between 2019 and 2023, having received almost $21 million in donations from foreign governments during the five-year period studied. The United States diplomatic cables leak revealed that the Atlantic Council worked closely with Chevron Corporation and ExxonMobil representatives to undermine the Brazilian legislative proposal to grant Petrobras chief operator of the pre-salt oil deposits in the Brazilian coast. Upon failure, the organization pivoted to undermine the institutions that held that legislation in place by openly supporting the impeachment of Dilma Rousseff and the ongoing lawfare against Petrobras. After the legislative victory, the success of the first auctions was announced in an event organized by the Woodrow Wilson International Center for Scholars, and the main contributors to the Atlantic Council on this endeavour, such as Chevron, ExxonMobil, Shell plc, and BP, were awarded with pre-salt exploration contracts.

== Events ==
The Atlantic Council creates a meeting place for heads of state, military leaders, and international leaders from both sides of the Atlantic. In 2009, the Council hosted former NATO Secretary General Anders Fogh Rasmussen's first major US speech, in which he discussed issues such as NATO's mission in the War in Afghanistan, NATO cooperation with Russia, and the broader transatlantic relationship. Members of the US Congress have also appeared, including Senator Richard Lugar and Secretary of State John Kerry. The council hosts events with sitting heads of state and government, including former Georgian President Mikheil Saakashvili, Ukrainian Prime Minister Arseniy Yatsenyuk, and former Latvian President Vaira Vīķe-Freiberga.

Since January 2007, the council has hosted military leaders from both sides of the Atlantic. The council's Brent Scowcroft Center on International Security has, held periodic events known as the Commanders Series, where it invites military leaders from the United States and Europe to speak about conflicts of interest to the Atlantic community. As part of the Commanders Series, American military leaders like former General George Casey, as well as former Admiral Timothy Keating, and European leaders, such as former French Chief of Defense General Jean-Louis Georgelin, or Dutch Lieutenant General Ton van Loon, have spoken on issues such as the Iraq War, the war in Afghanistan, and security threats in Asia and Africa. Its annual events include the Distinguished Leadership Awards in Washington, DC; the Future Leaders Summit; the Wroclaw Global Forum in Wroclaw, Poland; the Atlantic Council Energy & Economic Summit in Istanbul, Turkey; and the Global Citizen Awards in New York City.

On February 22, 2019, the Atlantic Council released its Declaration of Principles at the Munich Security Conference. Frederick Kempe, President and CEO of the Atlantic Council, said it was "an effort to rally and reinvigorate 'free peoples' around the world".

In August 2023, a senior Atlantic Council delegation led by former Lithuanian president Dalia Grybauskaitė visited Taiwan with support from the Taipei Economic and Cultural Representative Office and met with President Tsai Ing-wen. In 2024, the Atlantic Council and the Motwani Jadeja Foundation launched a joint delegation to India as part of the Global India Dialogues initiative. The delegation was announced during the Council's Global Citizen Awards event. In July 2024, the Atlantic Council co-hosted the NATO Public Forum during the 2024 Washington summit alongside NATO and other partner organizations. The forum featured discussions with political leaders, policymakers, and security experts on transatlantic security and alliance priorities.

In 2025, the Council and the Munich Security Conference announced a strategic partnership intended to strengthen cooperation on global security issues and expand joint programming and policy engagement.

== Reception ==
In 2016, the Atlantic Council drew criticism from the founder of the Human Rights Foundation for its decision to award a Global Citizen Award to Ali Bongo Ondimba. Bongo declined the award amidst controversy over the 2016 Gabonese presidential election. In July 2019, Russia said the activities of the Atlantic Council pose a threat to the foundations of its constitutional system and the security of the Russian Federation. Russia added the Atlantic Council to its list of undesirable organizations, preventing it from operating within Russia. Russian scholars Andrei Tsygankov, Pavel Tsygankov, and Haley Gonzalez (2023) noted pro-NATO and anti-Russian bias in Atlantic Council publications.

In September 2024, the Atlantic Council's Global Citizen Awards drew controversy after it was announced that Italian Prime Minister Giorgia Meloni would receive an award presented by businessman Elon Musk. Critics questioned the Council's decision in light of Meloni's political positions and Musk’s public political activities.

== See also ==
- Neoconservatism
- Special Relationship
