= Raj Panjabi =

American physician and White House official (born 1981)

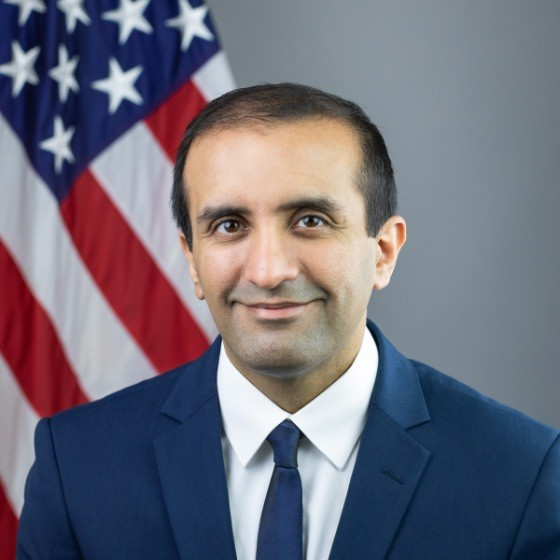

Senior Director for Global Health Security and Biodefense, National Security Council
- In office February 2022 – August 2023
- President: Joe Biden
- Preceded by: Elizabeth Cameron
- Succeeded by: Paul A. Friedrichs

U.S. Global Malaria Coordinator, United States Agency for International Development
- In office February 2021 – February 2022
- President: Joe Biden
- Preceded by: Kenneth Staley
- Succeeded by: David Walton

Personal details
- Born: Rajesh Ramesh Panjabi; February 3, 1981 (age 45) Monrovia, Liberia
- Education: University of North Carolina at Chapel Hill (BS, MD); Johns Hopkins University (MPH)
- Occupation: Physician, professor, entrepreneur, White House official.
- Website: www.rajpanjabi.com

Raj Panjabi (born February 3, 1981) is an American physician, entrepreneur, professor and former White House official.

Panjabi served in the Biden-Harris Administration from 2021 - 2023. President Joe Biden appointed Panjabi as White House Senior Director for Global Health Security and Biodefense on the United States National Security Council. Previously, President Joe Biden appointed Panjabi as the 3rd U.S. Global Malaria Coordinator to lead the U.S. President's Malaria Initiative.

Dr. Panjabi was named as one of the TIME 100 Most Influential People in the World in 2016, one of TIME's 50 Most Influential People in Health Care in 2018, received the 2017 TED Prize, and was listed as one of the World's 50 Greatest Leaders by Fortune in 2015 and in 2017.

Panjabi is the co-founder and former CEO of Last Mile Health and has served as Assistant Professor of Medicine at Harvard Medical School (part-time) and Brigham and Women's Hospital, visiting faculty at Harvard's Kennedy School of Government, and Advisor to former Liberian President Ellen Johnson Sirleaf, co-chair (with former New Zealand Prime Minister Helen Clark) of the Independent Panel for Pandemic Preparedness and Response.

== Early life and education ==
Panjabi's grandparents were ethnic-Sindhi refugees from Sind Province in modern-day Pakistan following the Partition of India in 1947, resettling in Mumbai and Indore. A generation later, Panjabi's parents migrated to Liberia, where Panjabi was born and raised. After civil war broke out in Liberia in 1989, Panjabi, at age nine, and his family fled on a rescue cargo plane to Sierra Leone and eventually sought refuge in the United States, resettling initially with a host family in High Point, North Carolina.

Panjabi graduated with a bachelor's degree and MD from the University of North Carolina School at Chapel Hill and received a Masters of Public Health in epidemiology from the Johns Hopkins Bloomberg School of Public Health. He was a Clinical Fellow at Harvard Medical School, and trained in internal medicine and primary care at the Massachusetts General Hospital.

== Career ==
=== Biden-Harris Administration ===
==== White House National Security Council ====
As White House Senior Director for global health security and biodefense and Special Assistant to the President of the United States, Panjabi played a pivotal role in the largest vaccination campaign in history against COVID-19, and White House responses to public health crises, including Mpox, Influenza, Ebola, and Marburg.

Panjabi oversaw implementation of the U.S. Global COVID-19 Response and Recovery Framework, and co-organized the 2022 Presidential Global COVID-19 Summit.

He played a lead role executing the 2022 National Biodefense and American Pandemic Preparedness Plans, coordinating over $12 billion in annual investment in biodefense, including in disease surveillance, diagnostics, therapeutics, vaccines and health systems. These investments are being driven by 16 federal agencies, including the Departments of Health and Human Services, Defense, Homeland Security, State, and the U.S. Agency for International Development. Panjabi also helped oversee implementation of the President's 2022 Executive Order on Advancing Biotechnology and Biomanufacturing Innovation, which directed federal agencies to drive research and development, streamline regulation, grow manufacturing, and expand markets for biotechnology products, including by leveraging artificial intelligence and synthetic biology.

Internationally, Dr. Panjabi oversaw White House implementation of the 2022 U.S. Global Health Security and International Pandemic Prevention, Preparedness and Response Act, which authorized $5 billion, expanding U.S. health investments in over 50 countries across Europe, Latin America, the Middle East, Africa, and Asia. He co-developed the President's COVID-19 and health security initiatives with the G7, G20, European Union, ASEAN, Quad (India, Australia, Japan, U.S.), CARICOM, and African Union, including efforts to organize Presidential Summits, launch the Pandemic Fund at the World Bank, negotiate the Pandemic Accord at the World Health Organization, and uphold the United Nations' Biological Weapons Convention.

==== U.S. President's Malaria Initiative ====
Panjabi was appointed by President Biden as the head of the U.S. President's Malaria Initiative. Panjabi was the first Asian American and first person born in Africa, where malaria remains endemic, to serve in the role. The U.S. President's Malaria Initiative, led by the U.S. Agency for International Development and co-implemented with the U.S. Centers for Disease Control and Prevention.

Panjabi oversaw efforts to help launch the world's first malaria vaccine, create a new strategy to help save 4 million more lives and prevent 1 billion more malaria cases, and approximately $800 million of annual investment in diagnostics, treatments, disease surveillance and health systems to protect 700 million people across 30 countries in Africa and Asia.

=== Independent Panel for Pandemic Preparedness and Response ===
Panjabi served as technical advisor to former President Ellen Johnson Sirleaf in her role as co-chair of the WHO Independent Panel for Pandemic Preparedness and Response. The Independent Panel was charged with publishing a landmark independent, impartial and comprehensive review of the global COVID-19 response and recommendations to prevent the next pandemic. In 2021, it published its main report, "COVID-19: Make it the Last Pandemic."

=== Last Mile Health ===
Panjabi is the co-founder and former CEO of Last Mile Health, an enterprise leveraging digital technology to train thousands of healthcare providers serving millions of people. He co-founded this organisation in 2007 with a small team of Liberian civil war survivors and American health workers and $6,000 (~$9,316 in 2025) he had received as a wedding gift.

In 2017, Panjabi and Last Mile Health received the $1 million (~$1.29 million in 2025) TED Prize to launch a global training platform called the Community Health Academy. In collaboration with several partners and governments, the Academy has launched online and mobile courses for frontline health leaders and providers working to strengthen community-based primary health care. Last Mile Health's health systems leadership and clinical courses have enrolled tens of thousands of current and future healthcare leaders, community health workers, nurses, midwives and frontline clinical providers, and other learners from nearly 200 countries, including the United States, India, Nigeria, Brazil, Canada, Indonesia, United Kingdom, Philippines and Pakistan.

As CEO of Last Mile Health, Panjabi led key efforts in response to 2013-16 Ebola epidemic in West Africa and the COVID-19 pandemic. Panjabi and the Last Mile Health team played a significant role in the 2013-16 West Africa Ebola epidemic, helping train over a thousand frontline and community health workers, mobilize hundreds of tons of personal protective equipment and support the Government of Liberia to organize and lead its National Ebola Operations Center. Panjabi delivered testimony at the US Senate Foreign Relations Subcommittee on Africa and Global Health Policy session, "A Progress Report of the West Africa Ebola Epidemic", arguing investments in rural community health workers can help make health systems responsive to Ebola and future epidemics. Panjabi served as health advisor to the Africa Union Africa Against Ebola Trust. He and Last Mile Health received Clinton Global Citizen Award, along with a coalition, for leadership in response to the 2013-16 West Africa Ebola epidemic.

In response to COVID-19, Panjabi and Last Mile Health has supported the Africa Centers for Disease Control and Prevention as well as national governments, including Liberia, Malawi, Uganda, and Ethiopia to train frontline health workers to respond to COVID-19. He has served as co-chair of the COVID Response Fund at Echoing Green, a venture philanthropy investing in social entrepreneurs addressing the most pressing social challenges facing marginalized communities across America.

=== Clinical Practice ===
Panjabi trained and worked as a clinical provider in community health systems in rural Alaska, North Carolina and Massachusetts. He has cared for outpatients on Medicaid and Medicare in federally qualified health centers pioneering value-based care and inpatients at Massachusetts General and Brigham and Women's Hospitals.

Panjabi worked as a physician at the Massachusetts General Hospital and Chelsea Community Health Center in Chelsea, Massachusetts, the COVID-19 epicenter in Massachusetts, where he cared for patients with COVID and urgent care needs.

=== Scholarship ===
Panjabi has authored or co-authored numerous publications, including on malaria, tuberculosis, HIV/AIDS, Ebola and COVID-19. He has chaired the Community Health Worker Exemplars in Global Health study with Gates Ventures (Private Office of Bill Gates) and the Gates Foundation, investigating lessons learned from exemplar community health systems in Brazil, Bangladesh, Ethiopia and Liberia. His and Last Mile Health's work on community and rural health care delivery has been published in The Lancet, the Journal of the American Medical Association, PLoS Medicine, the Bulletin of the World Health Organization, and the Journal of Global Health.

Panjabi was a co-author of the report Strengthening Primary Health Care through Community Health Workers: Investment Case and Financing Recommendations. The report found that extending the reach of the primary health care system by investing in community health worker programs can deliver a high economic return—up to 10:1—and calls on government leaders, international financiers, donors, and the global health community broadly to take specific actions to support the financing and scale up of community health worker programs across sub-Saharan Africa.

=== Speaking ===
Panjabi has lectured at Harvard Medical School, Harvard Kennedy School of Government, and Harvard Business School. He has delivered hundreds of speeches and presentations, including award-winning TED Talks. In 2017, Panjabi delivered a TED Talk entitled, "No One Should Die Because They Live Too Far From a Doctor." Panjabi's TED Talk has been viewed over one million times and was selected as a Top 10 TED Talk of 2017, alongside TED Talks from Pope Francis and Elon Musk. He gave additional TED talks in 2018 and 2019 on the power of investing in community and frontline health workers. Panjabi spoke on a panel hosted by The Elders in celebration of Nelson Mandela's 100th birthday in South Africa, with Former Irish President, Mary Robinson, and Former Liberian President, Ellen Johnson Sirleaf. Panjabi spoke at the TIME 100 Health Summit on Closing the Healthcare Gap. Panjabi highlighted the role of investing in rural community health workers at the TIME-Fortune Global Forum hosted by Pope Francis in 2016.

Panjabi delivered the commencement addresses at the graduations of Johns Hopkins Bloomberg School of Public Health in 2023, University of North Carolina Gillings School of Global Public Health in 2023, and Harvard Medical School in 2015, titled "The Power of Selfless Acts". He has delivered medical grand rounds at Harvard-teaching hospitals including Boston Children's Hospital, Massachusetts General Hospital, and Brigham & Women's Hospital, and gave a keynote address at the Institute for Healthcare Improvement's 2019 National Forum.

=== Board service ===
Panjabi has served on numerous boards, councils and commissions across the public, private and social sectors. These organizations include venture backed health technology companies, Merck for Mothers, Johnson & Johnson Global Public Health, the Global Fund for AIDS Tuberculosis and Malaria (as part of the U.S. constituency), the U.S. President's Emergency Plan for AIDS Relief (PEPFAR), the Bipartisan Commission on Biodefense (Ex-Officio Member), the Skoll Foundation, Echoing Green, Doctors for America, Last Mile Health, Ellen Johnson Sirleaf Presidential Foundation, Healthcare Without Harm and Practice GreenHealth, and the World Health Organization's Independent Panel for Pandemic Preparedness and Response, (as advisor to former Heads of State, Ellen Johnson Sirleaf of Liberia and Helen Clark of New Zealand).

Panjabi was a Gavi Champion, member of the International Advisory Group for Frontlines First at the Global Financing Facility of the World Bank Group, advisor to the Community Health Roadmap, and a member of the Community Health Worker Hub at the World Health Organization [WHO], where he served on the External Review Group for the WHO's guidelines on health policy and system support to optimize community health worker programs. Panjabi has served as advisor to the World Health Organization's Ambassador for Health Workforce.

=== Awards ===
Panjabi was named one of the World's 50 Greatest Leaders by Fortune in 2015 and 2017, listed as one of the 100 Most Influential People in the World by TIME in 2016 with a tribute from President Bill Clinton, one of TIME's 50 Most Influential People in Health Care in 2018, and received the 2017 TED Prize. He was recognized by Bill Gates in his "Heroes in the Field" series. Panjabi is a recognized social entrepreneur, receiving an Echoing Green Fellowship in 2011, a Draper Richards Kaplan Foundation Fellowship in 2013, the Skoll Award for Social Entrepreneurship and Schwab Social Entrepreneur of the Year from the World Economic Forum in 2017. In 2015, Panjabi accepted the Clinton Global Citizen Award on behalf of Last Mile Health and numerous organizations for "their leadership and collective response to the Ebola outbreak in West Africa and their continued effort to improve the health and well-being of the affected communities." In 2017, President Ellen Johnson Sirleaf and the Government of Liberia recognized Panjabi with one of Liberia's highest civilian honors: Distinction of Knight Commander in the Most Venerable Order of the Pioneers of the Republic of Liberia. In 2023, he received the Dean's Medal, the highest recognition Johns Hopkins University confers on public health leaders and the university's Distinguished Public Service Award.
