= R. Timothy Ziemer =

American naval officer (born 1946)

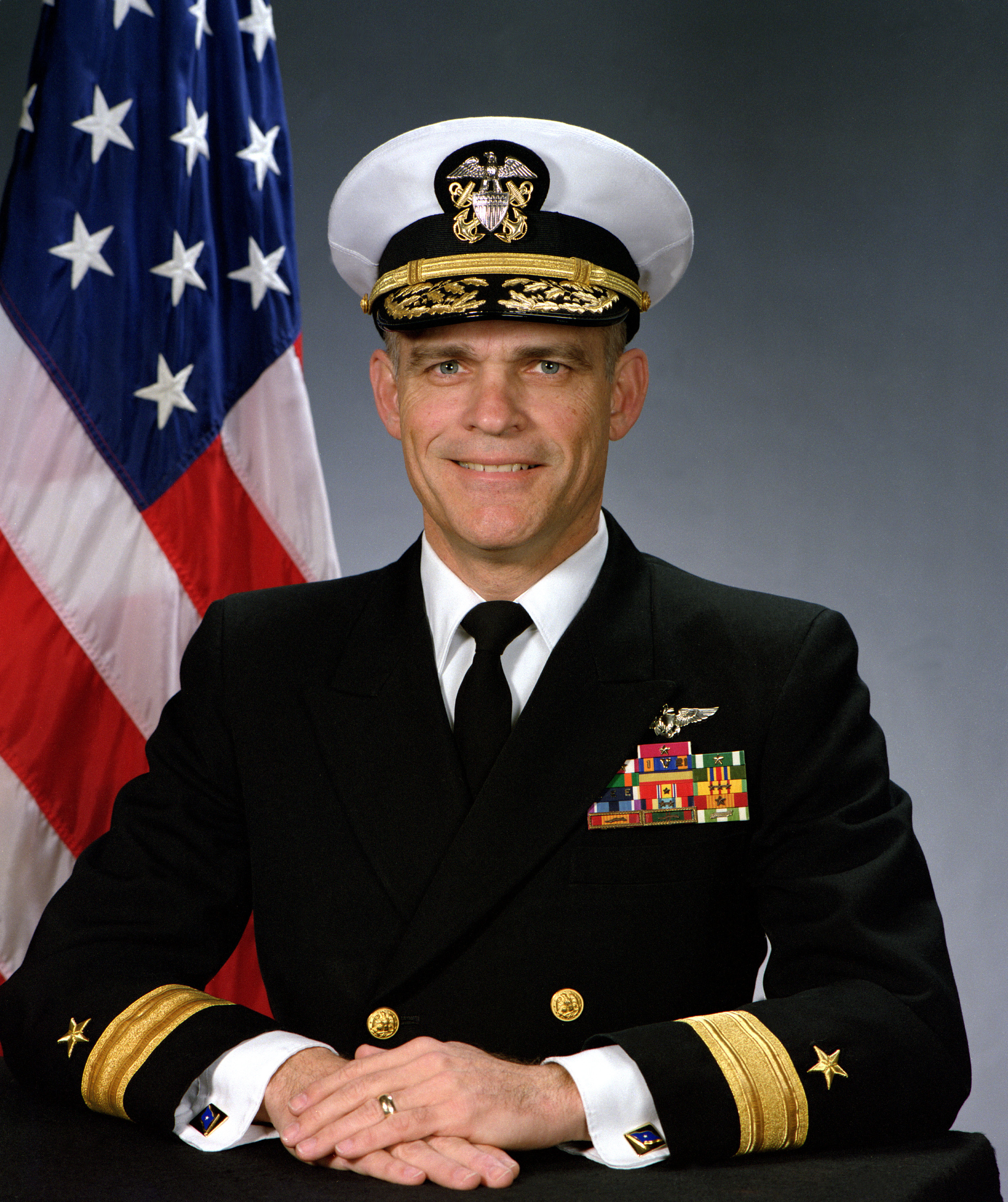
- Ziemer in 1996

Senior Director for Global Health Security and Biothreats, U.S. National Security Council
- In office April 2017 – May 8, 2018
- President: Donald Trump
- Preceded by: Elizabeth Cameron
- Succeeded by: Elizabeth Cameron (2021)

U.S. Global Malaria Coordinator, United States Agency for International Development
- In office June 2006 – April 2017
- President: George W. Bush; Barack Obama; Donald Trump
- Preceded by: Office established
- Succeeded by: Kenneth Staley

Personal details
- Born: Robert Timothy Ziemer; 1946 (age 79–80) Sioux City, Iowa, U.S.
- Education: Wheaton College
- Military career
- Allegiance: United States of America
- Branch: United States Navy
- Rank: Rear Admiral

R. Timothy Ziemer (born 1946) is an American retired naval officer. He was a U.S. Navy helicopter pilot in the Vietnam War, commanded several squadrons and an air wing during the First Gulf War, and completed his Navy career as commander of the Navy's Mid-Atlantic Region, with the rank of rear admiral. After retiring he became an expert in global disaster response and health threats. He led the President's Malaria Initiative from 2006 until 2017, then joined the National Security Council as the director in charge of global health security and biothreats, serving until May 8, 2018, when the position was abolished by the Trump administration.

== Early life and education ==
He was born in Sioux City, Iowa. The son of Christian missionaries, he grew up in Buôn Ma Thuột in what was then French Indochina (now Vietnam). Ziemer was fluent in Rade, the local language. In 1968, as he was about to graduate from Wheaton College, his father and five other missionaries were killed, his mother was wounded, and the missionary compound was destroyed during a major battle connected to the Tet Offensive of the Vietnam War.

== Navy career ==
Upon graduation from Wheaton College with a B.A. degree in history, Ziemer joined the United States Navy and became a Navy pilot. His first duty assignment was to fly helicopter gunships in South Vietnam with the Seawolves of HA(L)-3. He flew 550 missions in support of Navy SEALs and riverboat operations. Staying in the Navy, he moved up through the ranks. He commanded several squadrons and an air wing during the first Gulf War. On September 12, 1992, he became commander of Mayport Naval Station. Ziemer also taught at the Naval War College, and he served as deputy director for operations at the National Military Command Center (NMCC) on the Joint Staff J-3 directorate. His final assignment was as commander of Navy Region Mid-Atlantic, headquartered in Norfolk, Virginia, which provides shore support for the largest naval complex in the world.

== Post-Navy career ==
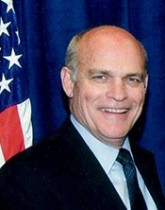
Ziemer in 2018

Retiring from the Navy after 30 years, he became vice president of the Arlington Institute, a think tank specializing in futures studies. He then became the executive director of World Relief, a global evangelical Christian humanitarian organization focusing on disaster relief, maternal and child health, and HIV/AIDS programs.

In 2006 President George W. Bush appointed him to lead the President's Malaria Initiative, which Bush had launched in 2005. This was an ambitious proposal to reduce the death toll from malaria in targeted African countries by 50%. Ziemer had contracted malaria himself as a child while living in French Indochina. In 2008, the program was expanded to additional countries in Africa as well as portions of Southeast Asia. He continued to serve as U.S. Global Malaria Coordinator until 2017. In his eleven years running the agency he established protocols for prevention and treatment that included "free distribution of insecticide-treated nets, indoor pesticide spraying, routine doses of malaria medicine for pregnant women, rapid blood tests for diagnosis, and a new fast-acting drug with one of the several longer-lasting drugs for treatment." During his tenure, worldwide malaria deaths dropped by 40%.

In 2017, Ziemer joined President Donald Trump's National Security Council as Senior Director for Global Health Security and Biothreats. His responsibilities in the role included preparedness against infectious diseases, including leading the response in case of a pandemic and strategies for defense against biological weapons. On May 8, 2018, he unexpectedly left the post and his position was abolished by the newly appointed National Security Advisor John Bolton, in what Bolton described as part of a plan to streamline the National Security Council and merge duplicate offices. As part of the restructuring, the global health security directorate led by Ziemer was disbanded, and folded into a new directorate focusing on counterproliferation and biodefense. While several staffers of the former Directorate for Global Health Security and Biodefense remained at work in the new directorate or elsewhere in the NSC, the effect of the change was that there was "no single official at the highest levels of the administration who focuses only on global health security."

Ziemer then served as an administrator in the Bureau for Democracy, Conflict, and Humanitarian Assistance within the U.S. Agency for International Development. In May 2020, he announced he would retire on June 5.

== Awards ==
While on active duty, Ziemer received multiple awards of the Legion of Merit, Meritorious Service Medal, Air Medal and Navy and Marine Corps Commendation Medal.

Ziemer was awarded the 2015 Roger E. Joseph Prize by the Hebrew Union College-Jewish Institute of Religion for his work on the President's Malaria Initiative. He was the commencement speaker for the Georgetown University Graduate School of Arts and Sciences in May 2015 and received the honorary degree of Doctor of Humane Letters. Ziemer also received the 2015 Distinguished Service to Society Award from the alumni association of his alma mater, Wheaton College.

== Personal life ==
He is married to the former Jodi Evans, whom he has known since childhood; she was the daughter of missionaries stationed near Ziemer's family.
