= WGF (disambiguation) =

WGF may refer to:

- Windows Graphics Foundation, part of Direct3D
- WGF (AM), a short-lived AM radio station
- Wrocław Global Forum, an annual transatlantic conference in Poland
- Women and Girls Foundation, an independent, community-based non-profit organization
- World Golf Foundation, a golf association established in 1994
