= List of Atlantic Council Distinguished Leadership Award recipients =

The Atlantic Council Distinguished Leadership Awards are presented annually by the Atlantic Council to individuals who demonstrate inspired leadership across key pillars of transatlantic relations, including political, business, military, artistic, and humanitarian sectors.

== Recipients ==
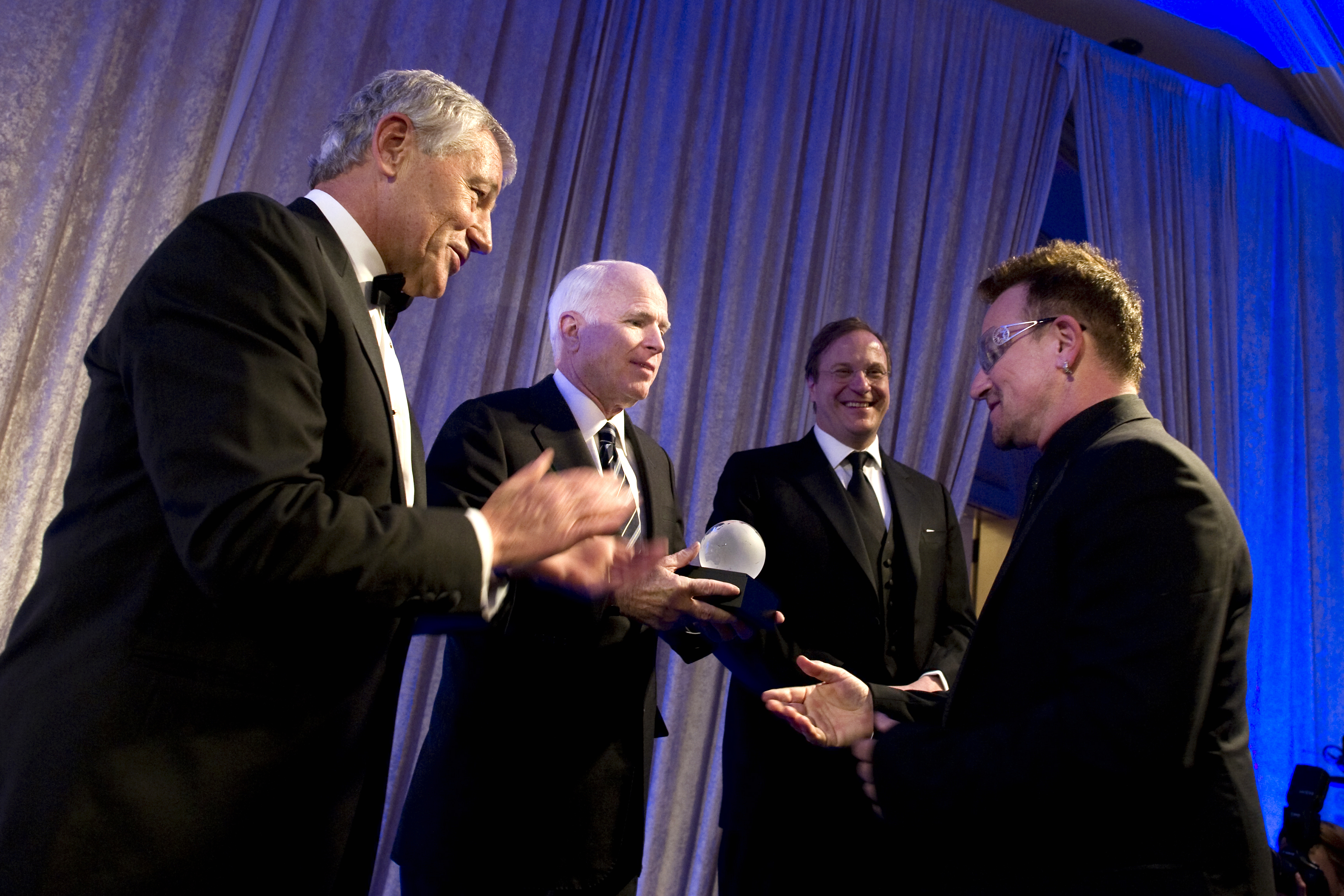
From left to right, U.S. Sen.Chuck Hagel, U.S. Sen. John McCain and Frederick Kempe, president, Atlantic Council, present Bono, rock star and activist, with the Distinguished Humanitarian Leadership Award at the annual Atlantic Council Awards Gala in Washington, D.C., April 26, 2010.

Recipients of the awards are as follows:

=== 2026 ===
- Ana Botín – Distinguished Business Leadership Award
- Mike Wirth – Distinguished Business Leadership Award
- Pierre Vandier – Distinguished Military Leadership Award
- Tanya Tucker – Distinguished Artistic Leadership Award

=== 2025 ===
- Andrej Plenković – Distinguished International Leadership Award
- John W. Raymond – Distinguished Military Leadership Award
- Judy Collins – Distinguished Artistic Leadership Award
- Victor Pinchuk – Distinguished Humanitarian Leadership Award
- Stephen Hadley – Distinguished Service Award

=== 2024 ===
- Klaus Iohannis – Distinguished International Leadership Award
- Gina Raimondo – Distinguished International Leadership Award
- Christopher G. Cavoli – Distinguished Military Leadership Award
- Michelle Yeoh – Distinguished Artistic Leadership Award

=== 2023 ===
- Dr. Ngozi Okonjo-Iweala – Distinguished International Leadership Award
- Avril Haines – Distinguished International Leadership Award
- Adena T. Friedman – Distinguished Business Leadership Award
- Gen. Laura J. Richardson – Distinguished Military Leadership Award
- The Women and Girls of Iran – Distinguished Humanitarian Leadership Award

=== 2022 ===
- H.E. Mario Draghi – Distinguished International Leadership Award
- Claudio Descalzi – Distinguished Business Leadership Award
- Jamala – Distinguished Artistic Leadership Award
- The People of Ukraine – Distinguished Leadership Award

=== 2021 ===
- Ursula von der Leyen – Distinguished International Leadership Award
- Albert Bourla – Distinguished Business Leadership Award
- Uğur Şahin – Distinguished Business Leadership Award
- Özlem Türeci – Distinguished Business Leadership Award
- Dua Lipa – Distinguished Artistic Leadership Award

=== 2020 ===
- Kristalina Georgieva – Distinguished International Leadership Award
- Luis Alberto Moreno – Distinguished International Leadership Award
- Lionel Richie – Distinguished Artistic Leadership Award

=== 2019 ===
- NATO – Distinguished International Leadership Award
- Christine Lagarde – Distinguished International Leadership Award
- Frederick W. Smith – Distinguished Business Leadership Award
- Adrienne Arsht – Distinguished Service Award

=== 2018 ===
- George W. Bush – Distinguished International Leadership Award
- Howard Schultz – Distinguished Business Leadership Award
- Curtis M. Scaparrotti – Distinguished Military Leadership Award
- Gloria Estefan – Distinguished Artistic Leadership Award

=== 2017 ===
- Jens Stoltenberg – Distinguished International Leadership Award
- William Clay Ford Jr. – Distinguished Business Leadership Award
- Michelle Howard – Distinguished Military Leadership Award
- Renée Fleming – Distinguished Artistic Leadership Award
- Princess Haya bint Hussein – Distinguished Humanitarian Leadership Award

=== 2016 ===
- Robert Gates – Distinguished International Leadership Award
- Henry Kravis – Distinguished Business Leadership Award
- Joseph Votel – Distinguished Military Leadership Award
- Vittorio Grigolo – Distinguished Artistic Leadership Award

=== 2015 ===
- Ashraf Ghani – Distinguished International Leadership Award
- Marillyn Hewson – Distinguished Business Leadership Award
- Philip Breedlove – Distinguished Military Leadership Award
- Toby Keith – Distinguished Artistic Leadership Award

=== 2014 ===
- José Manuel Barroso – Distinguished International Leadership Award
- Chuck Hagel – Distinguished International Leadership Award
- Thomas Enders – Distinguished Business Leadership Award
- Joseph Dunford – Distinguished Military Leadership Award
- Ruslana Lyzhychko – Distinguished Humanitarian Leadership Award

=== 2013 ===
- Anders Fogh Rasmussen – Distinguished International Leadership Award
- Hillary Clinton – Distinguished International Leadership Award
- John S. Watson – Distinguished Business Leadership Award
- Tony Bennett – Distinguished Artistic Leadership Award
- Juanes – Distinguished Humanitarian Leadership Award

=== 2012 ===
- Ban Ki-moon – Distinguished International Leadership Award
- Paul Polman – Distinguished Business Leadership Award
- The Enlisted Men and Women of the United States Armed Forces – Distinguished Military Leadership Award
- Anne-Sophie Mutter – Distinguished Artistic Leadership Award
- Prince Harry – Distinguished Humanitarian Leadership Award

=== 2011 ===
- Joe Biden – Distinguished International Leadership Award
- Muhtar Kent – Distinguished Business Leadership Award
- James G. Stavridis – Distinguished Military Leadership Award
- Plácido Domingo – Distinguished Artistic Leadership Award

=== 2010 ===
- Bill Clinton – Distinguished International Leadership Award
- Josef Ackermann – Distinguished Business Leadership Award
- Stéphane Abrial – Distinguished Military Leadership Award
- James Mattis – Distinguished Military Leadership Award
- Bono – Humanitarian Leadership Award

=== 2009 ===
- George H. W. Bush – Distinguished International Leadership Award
- Helmut Kohl – Distinguished International Leadership Award
- Samuel Palmisano – Distinguished Business Leadership Award
- David Petraeus – Distinguished Military Leadership Award
- Thomas Hampson – Distinguished Artistic Leadership Award

=== 2008 ===
- Tony Blair – Distinguished International Leadership Award
- Rupert Murdoch – Distinguished Business Leadership Award
- Michael Mullen – Distinguished Military Leadership Award
- Evgeny Kissin – Distinguished Artistic Leadership Award

=== 2007 ===
- Alan Greenspan – Distinguished International Leadership Award
- Stephen A. Schwarzman – Distinguished Business Leadership Award
- James L. Jones – Distinguished Military Leadership Award

=== 2006 ===
- John Warner – Distinguished International Leadership Award

=== 2005 ===
- Colin Powell – Distinguished International Leadership Award

=== 2004 ===
- Chuck Hagel – Distinguished International Leadership Award

=== 2003 ===
- Joseph Ralston – Distinguished International Leadership Award
- George Robertson, Baron Robertson of Port Ellen – Distinguished International Leadership Award

=== 2002 ===
- Robert Rubin – Distinguished International Leadership Award

=== 2001 ===
- Henry Kissinger – Distinguished International Leadership Award

=== 2000 ===
- Brent Scowcroft – Distinguished International Leadership Award

=== 1999 ===
- Paul Volcker – Outstanding Contribution to National Policy

=== 1998 ===
- Norman Augustine – Outstanding Contribution to National Security

=== 1996 ===
- Sam Nunn – Outstanding Contribution to National Security
