= Milton Semer =

American lawyer (1919–2016)

White House Counsel
- In office February 14, 1966 – December 31, 1966
- President: Lyndon Johnson
- Preceded by: Lee White
- Succeeded by: Harry McPherson

Personal details
- Born: March 5, 1919; Auburn, Maine, U.S.
- Died: July 27, 2016 (aged 97)
- Political party: Democratic

Milton Phillip Semer (March 5, 1919 – July 27, 2016) was an American lawyer.

== Career ==
He was General Counsel for the U.S. Housing and Home Finance Agency from 1961 to 1966.

Semer oversaw the campaign of Democratic Party politician Edmund S. Muskie. His work on the 1972 Edmund Muskie for President Committee landed him on the master list of Nixon's political opponents.

He was lawyer for Fernand St. Germain, Democratic U.S. Representative from Rhode Island, during an ethics investigation; St. Germain was cleared of all charges in 1987. Semer died in July 2016 at the age of 97.

Legal offices
Preceded by Lee White	White House Counsel; 1966	Succeeded by Harry McPherson
