= Atlantic Council Global Citizen Awards =

Annual award in New York, US

Atlantic Council Global Citizen Awards are presented annually by the Atlantic Council to honor individuals recognized for their contributions toward addressing global challenges. The awards are presented annually during the United Nations General Assembly week in New York.

== Recipients ==
Recipients of the awards are as follows:

=== 2026 ===
- Anthony Albanese - Prime Minister of Australia
- Alexander Stubb - President of Finland
- (United Kingdom) Cynthia Erivo - actress and singer
- (Italy) Stefano Domenicali, CEO of Formula One Group

=== 2025 ===
- Javier Milei - President of Argentina
- Emmanuel Macron, President of France
- Gianni Infantino, president of FIFA

=== 2024 ===
- Nana Akufo-Addo - President of Ghana
- Kyriakos Mitsotakis - Prime Minister of Greece
- Giorgia Meloni - Prime Minister of Italy
- (United States) Miky Lee - Vice chairwoman, CJ Group

=== 2023 ===
- Volodymyr Zelenskyy – President of Ukraine
- Olaf Scholz – Chancellor of Germany
- Fumio Kishida – Prime Minister of Japan
- Janet Yellen – United States Secretary of the Treasury
- (United States) Victor L.L. Chu – Chairman and CEO of First Eastern Investment Group (Distinguished Service Award)

=== 2022 ===
- Sauli Niinistö - President of the Republic of Finland
- Joko Widodo - President of the Republic of Indonesia
- Shinzo Abe - Former Prime Minister of Japan
- Magdalena Andersson - Prime Minister of the Kingdom of Sweden
- (India) Sundar Pichai - Chairman and CEO of Alphabet Inc, and its subsidiary Google
- (United States) Forest Whitaker - Actor and development activist

=== 2019 ===
- Sebastian Piñera Echenique - President of the Republic of Chile
- (United States) Brian Grazer - Storyteller, film producer, and philanthropist
- Mark Rutte - Prime Minister of the Netherlands
- (United States) will.i.am - Founder, Black Eyed Peas; founder and CEO, I.AM+; founding president, i.am.angel Foundation
- (United States) Anna Deavere Smith - Actress, playwright, teacher, and author, Atlantic Council’s first Artist in Residence

=== 2018 ===
- (Argentina) Mauricio Macri - President of the Argentine Republic
- John McCain - United States Senator from Arizona
- Erna Solberg - Prime Minister of Norway
- (Turkey) Hamdi Ulukaya - Founder, chairman and CEO, Chobani and founder, The Tent Partnership for Refugees

=== 2017 ===
- Justin Trudeau - Prime Minister of Canada
- (South Korea) Moon Jae-in - President of the Republic of Korea
- (China) Lang Lang - Pianist, educator, and philanthropist

=== 2016 ===
- Shinzō Abe - Prime Minister of Japan
- Matteo Renzi - Prime Minister of Italy
- (United States) Wynton Marsalis - Managing and artistic director, Jazz at Lincoln Center

=== 2015 ===
- Juan Manuel Santos - President of Colombia
- (Italy) Mario Draghi - European Central Bank President
- Yu Long - Artistic director, China Philharmonic

=== 2014 ===
- Shimon Peres - Former President of Israel
- Enrique Peña Nieto - President of Mexico
- Petro Poroshenko - President of Ukraine
- Lee Kuan Yew - Former Prime Minister of Singapore
- (United States) Robert De Niro - Actor, director, producer
- (United States) Llewellyn Sanchez-Werner - Piano virtuoso

=== 2013 ===
- Bronisław Komorowski - President of the Republic of Poland
- Queen Rania Al Abdullah - Hashemite Kingdom of Jordan
- (Japan) Seiji Ozawa - Conductor

=== 2012 ===
- (Myanmar) Aung San Suu Kyi - Chair, Burmese National League for Democracy
- Henry Kissinger - Former United States Secretary of State
- (Japan) Sadako Ogata - Former United Nations High Commissioner for Refugees
- (United States) Quincy Jones - Producer, composer, arranger, and humanitarian

=== 2011 ===
- (France) Christine Lagarde - Managing director, International Monetary Fund
- John Kerry - United States Secretary of State
- Rafik Hariri - Prime Minister of Lebanon (posthumous award)

=== 2010 ===
- (Germany) Klaus Schwab - Founder and executive chairman, World Economic Forum
