= Adrienne Arsht =

American lawyer

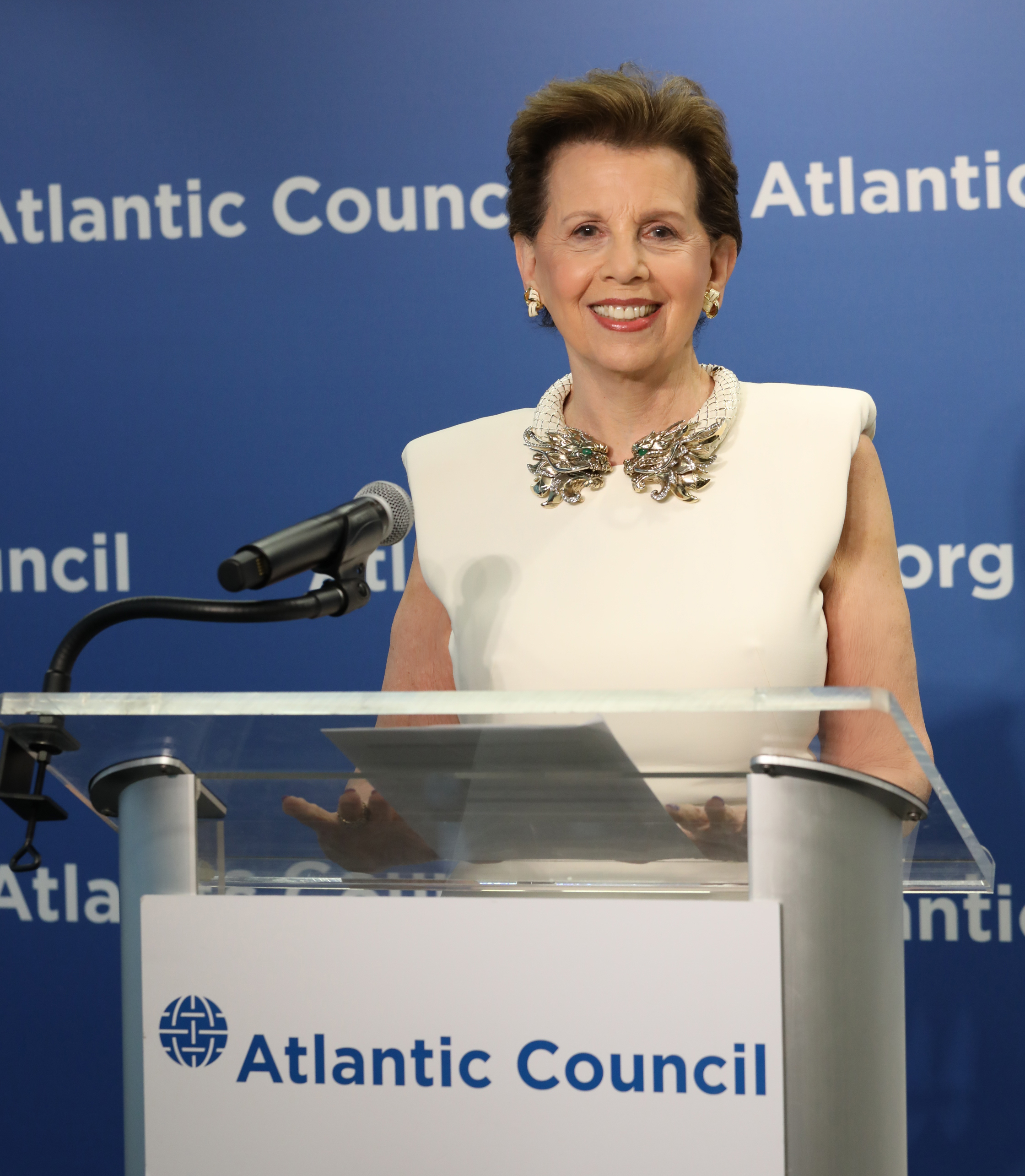
- Born: February 4, 1942 (age 84); Wilmington, Delaware, U.S.
- Education: Mount Holyoke College (BA); Villanova University (JD)
- Occupations: Founding chairman of the Adrienne Arsht Center Foundation, and chairman emerita of Totalbank
- Spouse: Myer Feldman (m. 1980; died 2007)
- Website: Official website

Adrienne Arsht (born February 4, 1942) is an American businesswoman and philanthropist.

== Personal life ==
Arsht was born to a Jewish family in Wilmington, Delaware, to Samuel Arsht, a Wilmington attorney, and Roxana Cannon Arsht, the first female judge in the State of Delaware. Arsht skipped her senior year at Tower Hill School and went directly to Mount Holyoke College, where she received her bachelor's degree. She then attended the Villanova University School of Law for her Juris Doctor J.D. Upon graduation, Arsht became the eleventh woman admitted to the Delaware bar. Her mother was the fifth.

Arsht was married to the late Myer Feldman (1914–2007), a former counsel to presidents John F. Kennedy and Lyndon B. Johnson.

== Career ==
Arsht began her Delaware law career in 1966 with the firm Morris, Nichols, Arsht & Tunnell. In 1969, she moved to New York City and joined the legal department of Trans World Airlines where she was the first woman to work in the airline industry's property, cargo, and government relations departments. She moved to Washington, D.C., in 1979, where she initially worked with a law firm and then started her own title company before moving to Miami in 1996 to run her family-owned bank, TotalBank.

From 1996 to 2007, Arsht served as chairman of the board of TotalBank. In that time, TotalBank grew from four locations to 14 with over $1.4 billion in assets. In November 2007, she sold the bank to Banco Popular Español for $300 million and was named Chairwoman Emerita of TotalBank.

== Philanthropy ==
In 2004, after the death of her parents, Arsht created the Arsht-Cannon Fund through the Delaware Community Foundation. Since its creation, the Arsht-Cannon Fund has given $4.5 million to non-profit organizations in Delaware, which have been specifically attributed to programs centered on the needs of Hispanic families. In the same year, she became the first woman to join the Million Dollar Roundtable of United Way of Miami-Dade County in Florida.

In 2005, Arsht announced a $2 million gift to Goucher College in Maryland, creating the Roxana Cannon Arsht Center for Ethics and Leadership in honor of her late mother, a Goucher graduate.

Arsht gave a $30 million contribution to Miami's Performing Arts Center in 2008. Subsequently, the former Carnival Center for the Performing Arts was renamed "The Adrienne Arsht Center for the Performing Arts of Miami-Dade County", or the Arsht Center for short. She became the founding chairman of the Adrienne Arsht Center Foundation.

In October 2008, Arsht committed more than $6 million to the University of Miami to support the university wide Arsht Ethics Programs, assist the Bascom Palmer Eye Institute of the University of Miami, and support other University of Miami initiatives.

In January 2009, The Chronicle of Philanthropy ranked Arsht number 39 on its 2008 America's 50 Biggest Donors list.

In February 2009, Arsht funded the creation of the Best Buddies Delaware chapter to specifically serve Hispanics and African-Americans with mental disabilities.

In 2009, she also co-funded the program "Arts in Crisis: A Kennedy Center Initiative,” which provided planning assistance and consulting services to struggling arts organizations throughout the United States. She donated $5 million to establish the Adrienne Arsht Musical Theater Fund at the Kennedy Center to support a wide variety of musical theater productions.

In May 2010, under Arsht's direction, the Arsht-Cannon Fund pledged $300,000 over three years to bring the Nemours Foundation BrightStart! Dyslexia Initiative to Delaware. The program is aimed at improving the reading and writing skills of young children and identifying those with learning disabilities at an early age.

In October 2012, the stage in Alice Tully Hall at Lincoln Center was dedicated to Arsht for her $10 million contribution in support of the transformation of Lincoln Center's facilities and public spaces.

In 2013, she endowed the Adrienne Arsht Latin American Center at The Atlantic Council with a $5 million gift. The goal of the center was to improve relationships between Latin American Countries, North America and Europe. She gifted the center an additional $25 million in 2022. In 2016, Arsht founded the Adrienne Arsht Center for Resilience at the Atlantic Council, donating $25 million.
