= U.S. Global Malaria Coordinator =

Position in the US government

The coordinator of United States government activities to combat malaria globally, known usually as the U.S. global malaria coordinator, is an official overseeing all U.S. government worldwide activities to combat malaria, most notably the President's Malaria Initiative. The position is presidentially appointed within the U.S. Agency for International Development. For its first eleven years the post was occupied by Admiral Tim Ziemer.

== List of U.S. global malaria coordinators ==
- R. Timothy Ziemer (RADM, Ret.) (June 2006–April 2017)
- Kenneth Staley (April 2018–January 2021)
- Raj Panjabi (February 2021–February 2022)
- Julie Wallace (acting) (February 2022–August 2022)
- David Walton (August 2022–Present)

== See also ==
- U.S. Global AIDS Coordinator
