= David O. Shullman =

American political scientist

- Education: Georgetown University (BA), Fletcher School (MA), UCLA (PhD)
- Occupations: Political scientist, former senior intelligence official
- Employer: Atlantic Council

David O. Shullman is an American political scientist. He served as Senior Director of the Atlantic Council's Global China Hub, leading the think tank's work on China, as well as an adjunct professor at Georgetown University. Previously he was a Senior Adviser overseeing democratic resilience building against authoritarian influence at the International Republican Institute between 2018 and 2021 and Deputy National Intelligence Officer for East Asia at the National Intelligence Council between 2016 and 2018.

== Education ==
Shullman received a BA in government from Georgetown University (2000), a MA in law and diplomacy with a focus on international relations and national security studies from the Fletcher School (2004), and a PhD in political science from UCLA (2011). He also holds a certificate in Mandarin Chinese from Beijing Normal University.

== Career ==
From 2001 to 2002 Shullman worked for Weber Shandwick as a public affairs associate. In 2007 he joined the Central Intelligence Agency (CIA) as a senior analyst. In 2016 he was appointed Deputy National Intelligence Officer for East Asia at the National Intelligence Council (NIC) in the Office of the Director of National Intelligence (ODNI). He has also been an adjunct senior fellow with the Center for a New American Security's Transatlantic Security Program.

== Publications ==
=== Reports ===
- Chinese Malign Influence and the Corrosion of Democracy, International Republican Institute, June 27, 2019 (editor)
- Democracy first: How the US can prevail in the political systems competition with the CCP, Brookings Institution, September 2020 (co-authored with Patrick W. Quirk and Johanna Kao)

=== Articles ===
- How China Exports Authoritarianism, Foreign Affairs, September 16, 2021 (co-authored with Charles Edel)
- China and Russia's Dangerous Convergence, Foreign Affairs, May 3, 2021 (co-authored with Andrea Kendall-Taylor)
- How the United States can protect democracy from China and Russia, The Hill, March 12, 2021 (co-authored with Patrick Quirk)
- Want to prevail against China? Prioritize democracy assistance, The Hill, October 1, 2019 (co-authored with Patrick Quirk)
- A Russian-Chinese Partnership Is a Threat to U.S. Interests, Foreign Affairs, May 14, 2019 (co-authored with Andrea Kendall-Taylor)
- How Russia and China Undermine Democracy, Foreign Affairs, October 2, 2018 (co-authored with Andrea Kendall-Taylor)

=== US Congressional testimonies ===
- The Roots of Coercion: China’s Leverage in Indo-Pacific Countries and the Future of PRC Gray Zone Tactics, July 28, 2022
