= Elizabeth Cameron =

American biodefense expert

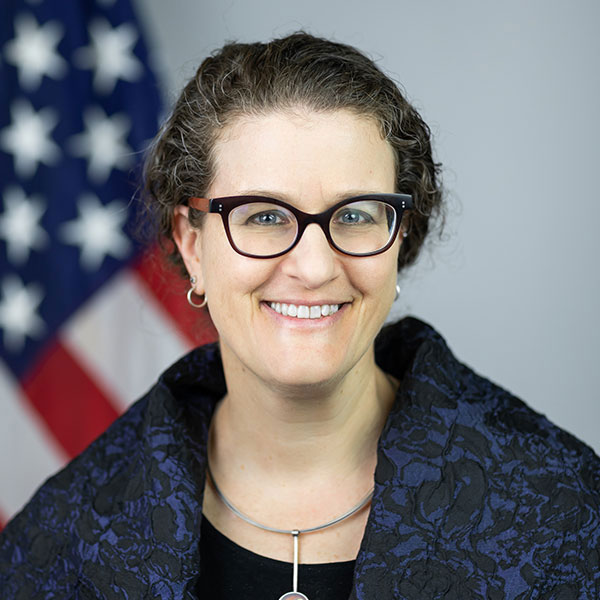

Senior Director for Global Health Security and Biodefense, National Security Council
- In office January 2021 – February 2022
- President: Joe Biden
- Preceded by: R. Timothy Ziemer (2018)
- Succeeded by: Raj Panjabi
- In office September 2016 – March 2017
- President: Barack Obama; Donald Trump
- Preceded by: Position Established
- Succeeded by: R. Timothy Ziemer

Personal details
- Education: University of Virginia (BA); Johns Hopkins University (PhD)
- Occupation: National security official
- Awards: Office of the Secretary of Defense Medal for Exceptional Civilian Service

Elizabeth Cameron is an American national security expert specializing in biosecurity, biodefense, and bioterrorism. She is a professor at the Pandemic Center of the Brown University School of Public Health. Previously, she served as Senior Director for Global Health Security and Biodefense on the White House National Security Council staff.

== Career ==
Cameron holds a BA in Biology from the University of Virginia and a Ph.D. in Biology from the Human Genetics and Molecular Biology Program at the Johns Hopkins University.

With the transition to the Biden administration in January 2021, Cameron was appointed as Senior Director for Global Health Security and Biodefense to the newly reinstated directorate of the White House National Security Council staff. She returned to this office, which she had helped to establish during the Obama administration. The directorate had been disbanded by the Trump administration in May 2018, a decision that Cameron criticized in the Washington Post as having "contributed to the federal government's sluggish domestic response" to the COVID-19 pandemic. Her previous work in this role included contributing to the development of the Global Health Security Agenda, an international effort by 69 countries to address the threat of infectious diseases. Cameron was also responsible for writing the 2016 "pandemic playbook" for the Obama White House, including a list of priorities for pandemic preparedness and response, which was said to have been "ignored by the [Trump] administration".

In 2017, Cameron assumed the role of Vice President for Global Biological Policy and Programs at the Nuclear Threat Initiative, a foreign policy think tank based in Washington, D.C. In this capacity, she co-led the development of the Global Health Security Index, a health security preparedness ranking of 195 states.

Between 2010 and 2013, Cameron worked in the Department of Defense, where she first served as Office Director for Cooperative Threat Reduction and later as Senior Adviser for the Assistant Secretary of Defense for Nuclear, Chemical & Biological Defense Programs. In recognition of her achievements, she was awarded the Office of the Secretary of Defense Medal for Exceptional Civilian Service.

Cameron is a member of the Council on Foreign Relations.

== Media coverage ==
The appointment and work of Cameron have been featured in various media outlets, including the New York Times, the Washington Post, CNBC, Politico, Wired, and Devex.

Moreover, Cameron herself has authored opinion pieces for the Washington Post, The Daily Beast, and The Hill. She has also been interviewed about her work on the 80,000 Hours podcast.

== Selected publications ==
- Cameron, Elizabeth; Yassif, Jaime; Jordan, Jacob (September 29, 2020). "Preventing Global Catastrophic Biological Risks: Lessons and Recommendations from a Tabletop Exercise held at the 2020 Munich Security Conference". Nuclear Threat Initiative.
- Cameron, Elizabeth; Nuzzo, Jennifer B.; Bell, Jessica A. (September 16, 2020). "Suboptimal US Response to COVID-19 Despite Robust Capabilities and Resources". Journal of the American Medical Association. 324 (14): 1391–1392. doi:10.1001/jama.2020.17395. PMID 32936215. S2CID 221747592.
- Ravi, SJ; Cameron, EL; et al. (2020). "The value proposition of the Global Health Security Index". BMJ Global Health. 5 (10) e003648. doi:10.1136/bmjgh-2020-003648. PMC 7545501. PMID 33033053.
- Ravi, S.J.; Cameron, E.; Meyer, D.; et al. (July 16, 2019). "Establishing a theoretical foundation for measuring global health security: a scoping review". BMC Public Health. 19 (1): 954. doi:10.1186/s12889-019-7216-0. PMC 6637489. PMID 31315597. S2CID 197540767.
