= Lee C. White =

American presidential advisor

Lee White
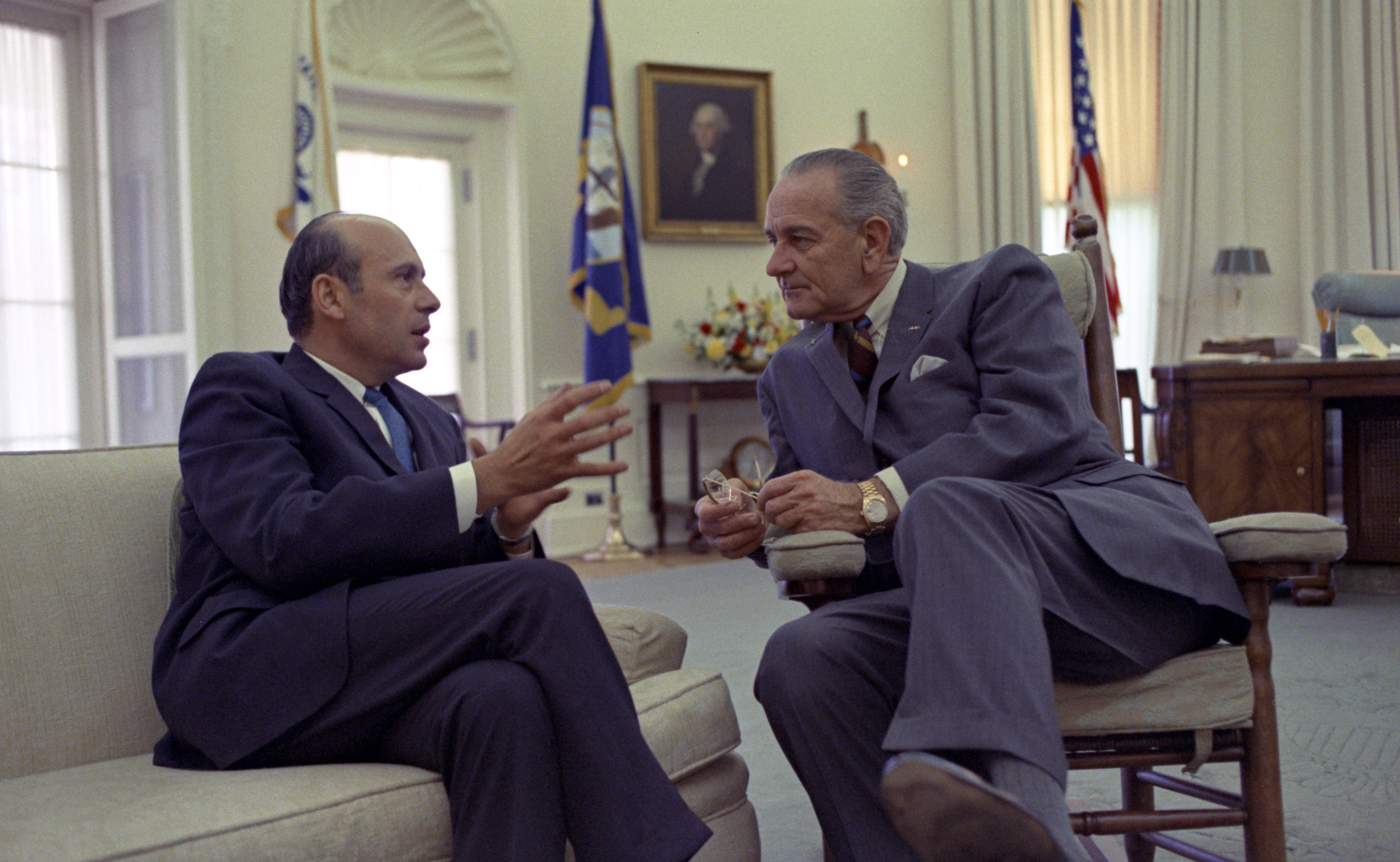

White House Counsel
- In office 17 January 1965 – 11 February 1966
- President: Lyndon B. Johnson
- Preceded by: Mike Feldman
- Succeeded by: Harry McPherson; Milton Semer

Personal details
- Born: Lee Calvin White; September 1, 1923 Omaha, Nebraska, U.S.
- Died: October 31, 2013 (aged 90) Bethesda, Maryland, U.S.
- Party: Democratic
- Education: University of Nebraska, Lincoln (BS, LLB)

Lee Calvin White (1 September 1923 – 31 October 2013) was an advisor to both President Kennedy and Johnson, most notably on civil rights matters.

== Early life and education ==
White studied electrical engineering at the University of Nebraska graduated with a B.S. White then began studying law at the University of Nebraska College of Law graduating with his L.L.B.

== Career ==
White worked as an attorney for the Tennessee Valley Authority. From 1954 to 1957, and then from 1958 to 1961, he was assistant to Senator John F. Kennedy. From 1961 to 1963 he was Assistant Special Counsel to President Kennedy. From 1963 to 1966 he was Associate Special Counsel, and then Special Counsel, to President Johnson. From 1966 to 1969 he was Chairman of the Federal Power Commission.

According to historian Robert Dallek, although he was "not overtly or dramatically evident as a public figure, he worked behind the scenes in an effective way to deliver on executive reforms or actions." He was instrumental in pushing through Congress the Voting Rights Act of 1965.

== In popular culture ==
In the 2014 film Selma, he was played by Giovanni Ribisi.

Legal offices
Preceded by Mike Feldman	White House Counsel; 1965–1966	Succeeded by Harry McPherson
Preceded by Mike Feldman	White House Counsel; 1965–1966	Succeeded by Milton Semer
