= Myer Feldman =

American political aide (1914–2007)

Mike Feldman
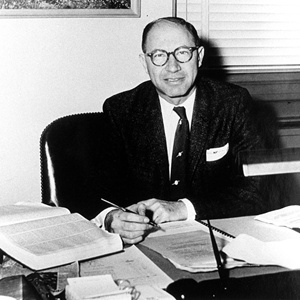

White House Counsel
- In office April 1964 – January 17, 1965
- President: Lyndon B. Johnson
- Preceded by: Ted Sorensen
- Succeeded by: Lee White

Personal details
- Born: Myer Feldman; June 22, 1914 Philadelphia, Pennsylvania, U.S.
- Died: March 1, 2007 (aged 92) Bethesda, Maryland, U.S.
- Party: Democratic
- Spouses: Jackie Moskovitz (m. 1941–1979) Adrienne Arsht (m. 1981–2007)
- Children: 2
- Education: University of Pennsylvania (BS, LLB)

Military service
- Allegiance: United States
- Branch/service: United States Army Air Forces
- Years of service: 1942–1945

Myer Feldman, known as Mike Feldman (June 22, 1914 – March 1, 2007), was an American political aide in the Kennedy and Johnson administrations. Hailing from Philadelphia, Feldman was a trained lawyer and alumnus of the University of Pennsylvania, which he attended on a scholarship. He served in the Army Air Force during the Second World War prior to joining Kennedy's campaign trail in 1957.

Under Kennedy he was tasked with compiling negative information on Richard Nixon during Kennedy's election campaign, as well as helping with speech writing and television interviews. His files on Nixon became known collectively as the "Nixopedia". He also worked on agriculture issues and foreign relations on the subject of nuclear arms sales, often meeting secretly with Israeli Prime Minister David Ben Gurion and Foreign Minister Golda Meir. He was known for the rhyming couplets used when he and Theodore C. Sorensen, whom he succeeded as White House Counsel, traded memos. In 1964 the New York Post called him "the White House's anonymous man."

Upon Kennedy's assassination, Johnson retained Feldman for similar tasks against election rival Barry Goldwater. After retiring from government service in 1965, Feldman founded a law firm that dealt with legal issues in radio, and chaired committees on the Special Olympics. In this role, he created the "President's Council on Mental Retardation" and was key to the event's early organisation. He was also a literary critic and playwright. He died in Bethesda, Maryland, in 2007.

== Life and career ==
=== Early life ===
Feldman was born in Philadelphia, Pennsylvania in 1914. Both his parents were Ukrainian-born and had arrived in the United States three years previously. He attended Girard College (which despite its name is a high school (as high schools in first half of the 19th century were sometimes referred to as colleges). He worked briefly for a roofing company before winning a scholarship to the Wharton School of Finance at University of Pennsylvania. As a student he helped Penn football coach Harvey Harman scout opposition teams. He graduated in 1938 with a degree in Law from the University of Pennsylvania Law School, and began to teach the subject there up until the outbreak of World War II.

=== Military service ===
Feldman, who had married classmate Silva "Jackie" Moskovitz in 1941, joined the armed forces in 1942, serving in the Army Air Force. Following the end of hostilities he was discharged and worked for the Securities and Exchange Commission from 1946 until 1954 as executive assistant to the chairman, and then from 1955 until 1957 he worked for the Senate Banking and Currency Committee. Here he met Ted Sorensen, who was then working with Kennedy.

=== Under Kennedy ===
Feldman joined the Kennedy campaign in 1958 as a legislative assistant. Kennedy "gleefully assigned the city boy to agricultural issues" and often greeted Feldman with "Mike, how are the crops?". He also gathered information on Richard Nixon, who was running against Kennedy. He would serve in this capacity until 1961, whereupon he became Deputy Special Counsel to the President. He became a speechwriter and legal advisor on trade legislation. He assisted Kennedy in countering critique of his Roman Catholic background by finding "Irish-sounding names of Texans who had died at the Alamo for Kennedy to use in the speech" as well as prepping the President for televised interviews. Feldman also became close with the Kennedy family, particularly Eunice Kennedy Shriver.

If Mike ever turned dishonest, we could all go to jail.

— John F. Kennedy on Feldman.

Feldman advised the President regarding foreign relations on the subject of nuclear arms sales, often meeting secretly with Israeli Prime Minister David Ben Gurion and Foreign Minister Golda Meir. Feldman, after protesting that his background may have made him biased towards Israel, was told by Kennedy that it was his background that made him suitable for the role. His intelligence gathering led to crucial judgements in the United States on Israel's nuclear capability. His estimations contradicted those made by CIA Director Richard Helms.

Feldman would have breakfast with the President on the morning of any day on which a press conference was scheduled. A 1962 New York Times articles rated him as highly integral to the running of the Presidency, citing that his low license-plate number, 116, was the lowest at the White House and therefore a sign of his importance. Feldman was known for the rhyming couplets used when he and Sorensen traded memos. In 1964 the New York Post called him "the White House's anonymous man."

=== Johnson administration ===
Following the Kennedy Assassination on November 22, 1963 and the subsequent swearing in of Lyndon Johnson as President of the United States, Feldman was retained in the cabinet as a general advisor. He also renewed his role gathering intelligence on his President's political rival – in this case Senator Barry M. Goldwater, Feldman would encourage reporters who were hostile to Goldwater to follow and harangue him. In 1965, Feldman retired from government administration.

=== After government ===
In 1965 Feldman was a founding partner of Ginzburg and Feldman, a law firm based in Washington DC. The firm grew to have over 100 lawyers in its employ, and was financially successful working with radio stations and real estate in Washington throughout the 1970s. In 1972 Senator George McGovern, who was undertaking a run for President, sought out Feldman to approach Edward Kennedy to ask him to be McGovern's running mate. Feldman did so, and received Kennedy's negative response.

Feldman continued to work in politics, though largely in background roles. He dedicated more of his time working towards the Special Olympics, being a member of the board and chairman of the executive committee. He had two children but then divorced his first wife, Jackie Moskovitz, in 1979. He married Adrienne Arsht in 1981. Away from his professional life, he was a literary critic for the Saturday Review of Literature and, known for his wit, produced six plays. He died in 2007 of heart disease at Suburban Hospital in Bethesda, Maryland.

== See also ==
- List of Jewish American jurists

Legal offices
| Preceded by Ted Sorensen | White House Counsel; 1964–1965 | Succeeded by Lee White |
