= President's Malaria Initiative =

US government disease prevention initiative

- U.S. Government global health program
- Launch year: 2005
- Implementing agencies: USAID, CDC
- Key officials: U.S. Global Malaria Coordinator
- Focus countries: 24 (+ 3 programs in the Greater Mekong Subregion)
- Budget: $723 million (FY17)

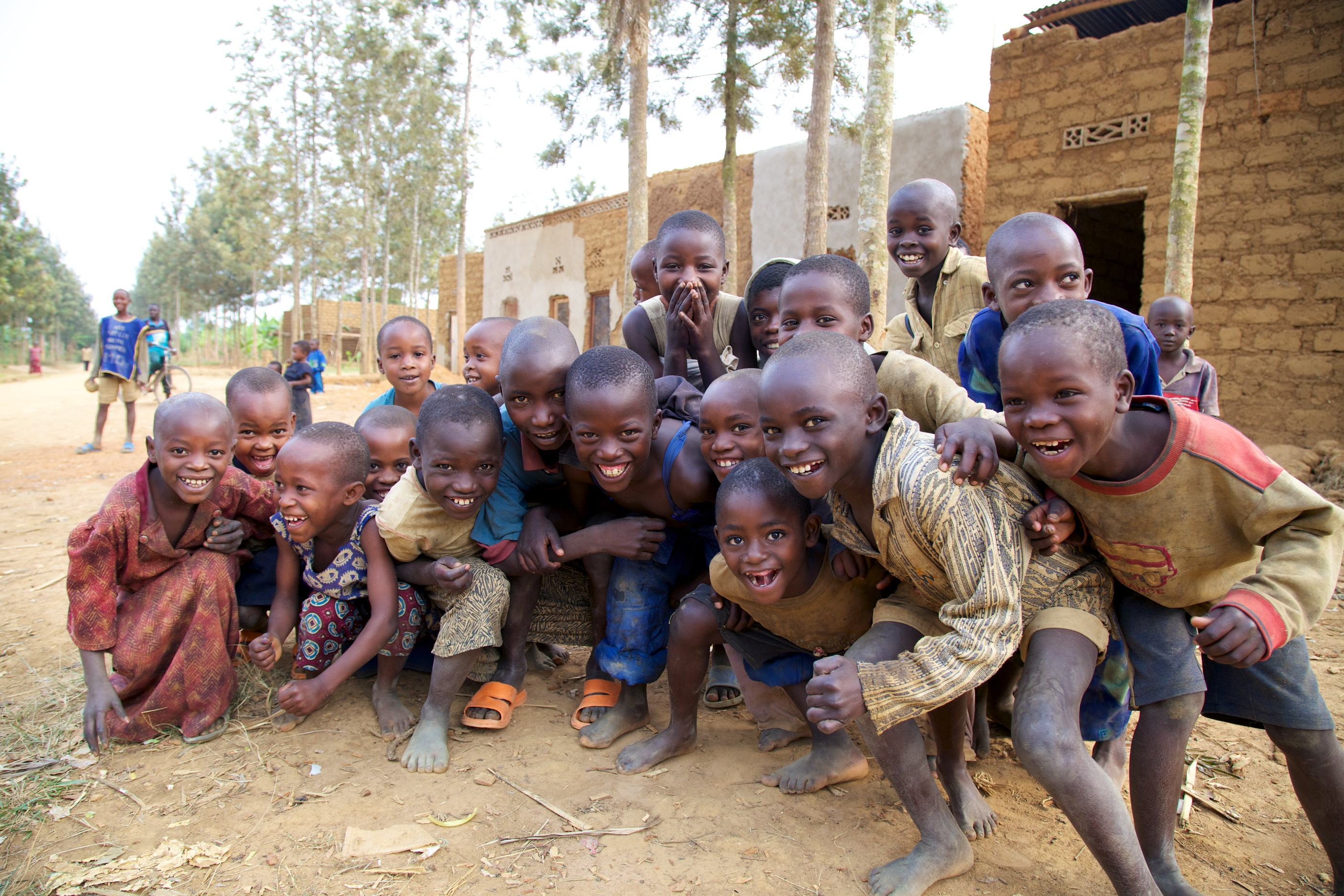

The President's Malaria Initiative (PMI) is a U.S. Government initiative to control and eliminate malaria, one of the leading global causes of premature death and disability. The initiative was originally launched by U.S. president George W. Bush in 2005, and has been continued by each successive U.S. president.

PMI was originally created with a mission to "reduce malaria-related mortality by 50 percent across 15 high-burden countries in sub-Saharan Africa". PMI has since expanded to 24 malaria-endemic countries in sub-Saharan Africa and 3 additional countries in the Greater Mekong Subregion of Southeast Asia, where it seeks to further reduce malaria burden and assist countries in achieving malaria elimination.

PMI works closely with national malaria programs and global partners including the World Health Organization, Roll Back Malaria, and Global Fund. Global malaria efforts, including those of PMI, have cut malaria mortality by over 60%, saved 7.6 million lives, and prevented 1.5 billion malaria cases globally between 2000 and 2019. PMI has supported malaria prevention and control for over 500 million at-risk people in Africa. In 2025, an estimated 47% of USAID funding for PMI was cut, undermining prevention, treatment, and surveillance programs. Experts warn these reductions risk reversing decades of progress, increasing mortality, and weakening global health security.

== History ==
The U.S. Leadership Against HIV/AIDS, Tuberculosis, and Malaria Act of 2003 originally authorized the U.S. Government to provide 5 years of malaria funding to bilateral partners and the Global Fund. PMI was subsequently launched by President George W. Bush in 2005. In 2008, PMI was reauthorized for another 5 years of funding by the Lantos-Hyde Act, which also called for development of a comprehensive U.S. Global Malaria Strategy, the latest version of which is the U.S. Global Malaria Strategy 2015-2020. PMI served as a major component of the Global Health Initiative, a six-year, $63-billion effort proposed by President Obama in May 2009.

== Funding ==
The US government, including through PMI, is currently the largest international source of financing for malaria. PMI's global budget for FY2017 was $723 million.

Annual PMI funding
Fiscal year	Budget	Number of focus countries
2006	$30 million	3
2007	$154 million	7
2008	$296 million	15
2009	$300 million	15
2010	$500 million	15
2011	$578 million	19 (and the Mekong Subregion)
2012	$604 million	19 (and the Mekong Subregion)
2013	$608 million	19 (and the Mekong Subregion)
2014	$619 million	19 (and the Mekong Subregion)
2015	$619 million	19 (and the Mekong Subregion)
2016	$621 million	19 (and the Mekong Subregion)
2017	$723 million	24 (and the Mekong Subregion)

In 2025, during the second Trump administration, an estimated 47% of USAID funding for PMI was cut. In countries such as the Democratic Republic of the Congo (DRC), these funds had supported the supply of antimalarial drugs to numerous health zones, including preventive treatments for pregnant women. Health officials in the DRC reported that the effects of these cuts were already being felt, with increased risk of severe illness and death from malaria among vulnerable populations. Former aid workers and experts also expressed concern that reduced funding undermined disease surveillance systems that help detect malaria and other outbreaks early. Such surveillance not only protects affected countries but also contributes to U.S. health security by limiting the global spread of disease. Aid organizations also highlighted how these cuts create a "vicious cycle," with malnutrition and malaria reinforcing one another. Reductions in U.S. support for nutrition programs increase children's vulnerability to malaria and other diseases, while higher malaria infections can worsen malnutrition.

== Structure and governance ==
PMI is interagency initiative overseen by the U.S. global malaria coordinator in consultation with an Interagency Advisory Group composed of representatives from USAID, CDC, the Department of State, the Department of Defense, the National Security Council, and Office of Management and Budget. The initiative is led by USAID and implemented together with CDC. In addition to US-based staff at USAID and CDC headquarters, PMI maintains resident advisors from both agencies in each focus country.

== Countries ==
PMI currently provides direct support to 24 "focus" countries and 3 additional country programs in the Greater Mekong Subregion. At the time of its launch in 2005, PMI provided support to just three countries: Angola, Tanzania, and Uganda. Four additional countries (Malawi, Mozambique, Rwanda, and Senegal) were added the following year. By 2007, PMI had added Benin, Ethiopia, Ghana, Kenya, Liberia, Madagascar, Mali, and Zambia—bringing the total number of focus countries to the originally envisioned total of 15 high-burden nations.

In 2010, PMI added the Democratic Republic of the Congo, Nigeria, Guinea, Zimbabwe, and the Mekong Subregion.

In 2017, with additional funding from Congress, PMI expanded to 5 more countries: Burkina Faso, Cameroon, Cote d'Ivoire, Niger, and Sierra Leone.

== Results ==
PMI is estimated to have prevented 185 million malaria cases and nearly 1 million deaths between 2005 and 2017. Globally, malaria mortality fell by more than 60% between 2000 and 2015. The presence of a PMI program in a country has also been associated with a significant reduction in all-cause under-5 child mortality.

== See also ==
- PEPFAR
- U.S. Global Malaria Coordinator

== More sources ==
- Smith, Gayle (26 February 2015). "Putting an End to a Preventable Scourge". whitehouse.gov – via National Archives.
