= Wrocław Global Forum =

Annual conference in Poland

- Status: Inactive
- Genre: Geopolitics, international relations, and economics
- Frequency: Annual
- Venue: Wrocław Congress Center
- Locations: Wrocław, Poland
- Inaugurated: 2010
- Most recent: 2016
- Attendance: 200–400+
- Organizer: • Atlantic Council; • Polish Institute of International Affairs (PISM); • City of Wrocław

Wrocław Global Forum (WGF) is an annual transatlantic conference centered on topics related to democracy, prosperity and security. Launched in 2010, the event is held in Wrocław, Poland. It is organized by the Atlantic Council, the Polish Institute of International Affairs and the city of Wrocław. The most recent forum took place on June 2–3, 2016.

== History ==
The first Wrocław Global Forum was held in October 2010. At the time, the event was under the auspices of the Atlantic Council, the DemosEUROPA Centre for European Strategy and the city of Wrocław. The stated aim of the Forum was "Strengthening the Transatlantic Dialogue to Tackle Global Challenges." The second Forum, with about 200 attendees, took place in June 2011, and focused on energy security and the role of NATO. The third Forum, held in late May and early June, 2012, explored whether the transatlantic model of democracy can be applied to other parts of the world as the centers of wealth shift eastward and southward. The fourth WGF, for the first time co-organized by the Polish Institute of International Affairs, was held in June 2013. The approximately 350 participants examined the role of Central Europe as an actor within the continent, the European Global Strategy and the global role of the U.S. In June 2014, the fifth Forum focused on the events in Ukraine as well as taking a retrospective look at the 25 years that had passed since the fall of Communism in Europe, the 15 years since the enlargement of NATO and the 10 years since the first wave of former Soviet Bloc countries were admitted to the EU. The sixth WGF, held in June 2015, introduced Business Leadership Dialogues, designed to facilitate communication between executives and policymakers on topics like defense, IT innovation and energy. The event also addressed the post-Crimea security environment. The most recent, seventh WGF took place in June 2016 and had more than 400 participants. Speakers previewed the 2016 NATO summit in Warsaw and surveyed the challenges facing the alliance. In July 2017, together with the WGF will be the "Forum of Three sea", which will be attended by 12 leaders of the countries of Central and Eastern Europe: Poland, Czech Republic, Austria, Bulgaria, Croatia, Estonia, Latvia, Lithuania, Romania, Slovakia, Slovenia and Hungary.

== Participants ==
Participants at the Wrocław Global Forum range from active and former politicians, diplomats and top military officers to journalists, academics and business leaders. The number of attendees has gradually risen from around 200 to over 400. High-profile speakers at the various plenary and group sessions in recent years have included former Russian Prime Minister Mikhail Kasyanov, former U.S. National Security Advisor General James Jones, former chess world champion and current Human Rights Foundation Chairman Garry Kasparov, Admiral James Stavridis, at the time Supreme Allied Commander Europe, New Hampshire Senator and former Governor Jeanne Shaheen and NATO Deputy Secretary General Alexander Vershbow.

== Freedom Awards ==
The Atlantic Council's Freedom Awards are presented at the Wrocław Global Forum annually. Established in 2009 to commemorate the twentieth anniversary of the fall of the Berlin wall, the Awards recognize the contribution of individuals and organizations in defending and expanding the cause of freedom worldwide. Recipients include former and currently serving politicians, such as U.S. Senator John McCain or former Swedish Prime Minister Carl Bildt; movements like the Damas de Blanco in Cuba or the Syrian Civil Defense; cultural institutions, such as the Belarus Free Theater and Donetsk National University; entire peoples of countries as well as artists, diplomats and activists.

== Venue ==
The Forum is held in Wrocław, in the southwestern part of Poland. The venue for the event is the Wrocław Congress Center in the Centennial Hall complex, which is managed by the Wrocław Convention Bureau. The Congress Center features the standard amenities of a modern conference center, with catering options and meeting rooms of widely varying sizes. The convention experience is enhanced by a green area on the outside grounds, and a Multimedia Fountain capable of displaying colorfully lit jets and visualizations projected onto a water screen.

== Funding ==
The Forum receives institutional support from the governments of the United States and Poland. Financial support is provided by various corporate sponsors, including American defense giants Raytheon and Lockheed Martin as well as large global companies such as Google, 3M and Airbus. Polish businesses like PZU and Coca-Cola Polska also offer support.
