= Delaware Community Foundation =

Philanthropic organization

- Location: United States

The Delaware Community Foundation (DCF), one of more than 750 community foundations in the United States, is a nonprofit organization that establishes and manages charitable funds for individuals and organizations primarily from the state of Delaware and surrounding areas. Fundholders include individuals, families, businesses and organizations. The DCF awards annual grants of approximately $15 million and manages over $280 million in assets. The organization's 25th anniversary celebration in 2011 was attended by Vice President Joe Biden, who served as one of Delaware's U.S. Senators for 36 years.

== Background ==
The DCF, which is led by CEO Stuart Comstock-Gay, distributes an average of $15 million per year in scholarships and grants to nonprofit organizations serving people in Delaware. The DCF also encourages more people to become involved in charitable giving, primarily through four programs:

- African American Empowerment Fund of Delaware
- Fund for Women
- The Next Generation, and
- Youth Philanthropy Boards.
