= United States National Security Council =

Federal executive national security and intelligence forum

Agency overview
- Formed: September 18, 1947
- Headquarters: Eisenhower Executive Office Building
- Agency executives: President Donald Trump, Chairman; Marco Rubio, National Security Advisor
- Parent agency: Executive Office of the President of the United States
- Key document: National Security Act of 1947

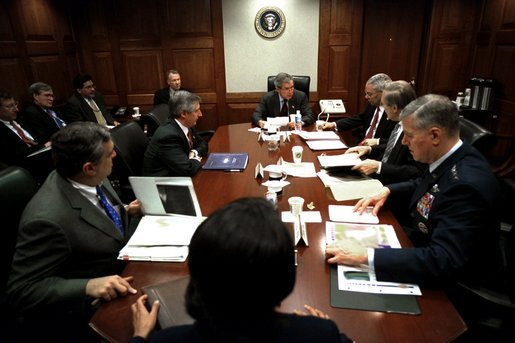
President George W. Bush during a National Security Council (NSC) meeting at the White House Situation Room, March 21, 2003. The participants in the meeting, including Secretary of Defense Donald Rumsfeld, Chairman of the Joint Chiefs of Staff General Richard B. Myers, Secretary of State Colin Powell, Director of the Central Intelligence Agency (CIA) George Tenet, National Security Advisor Condoleezza Rice and White House Chief of Staff Andy Card.

The United States National Security Council (NSC) is the national security council used by the president of the United States for consideration of national security, military, and foreign policy matters. Based in the White House, it is part of the Executive Office of the President of the United States, and composed of senior national security advisors and presidential cabinet officials.

Since its inception in 1947 by President Harry S. Truman, the function of the council has been to advise and assist the president on national security and foreign policies. It also serves as the president's principal arm for coordinating these policies among various government agencies. The council has subsequently played a key role in most major events in U.S. foreign policy, from the Korean War to the war on terror.

== History ==
The immediate predecessor to the National Security Council was the National Intelligence Authority (NIA), which was established by President Harry S. Truman's Executive Letter of January 22, 1946, to oversee the Central Intelligence Group, the CIA's predecessor. The NIA was composed of the secretary of state (James F. Byrnes and George C. Marshall), the secretary of war (Robert P. Patterson), the secretary of the Navy (James Forrestal), and a personal representative of President Truman (William D. Leahy, the chief of staff to the commander in chief).

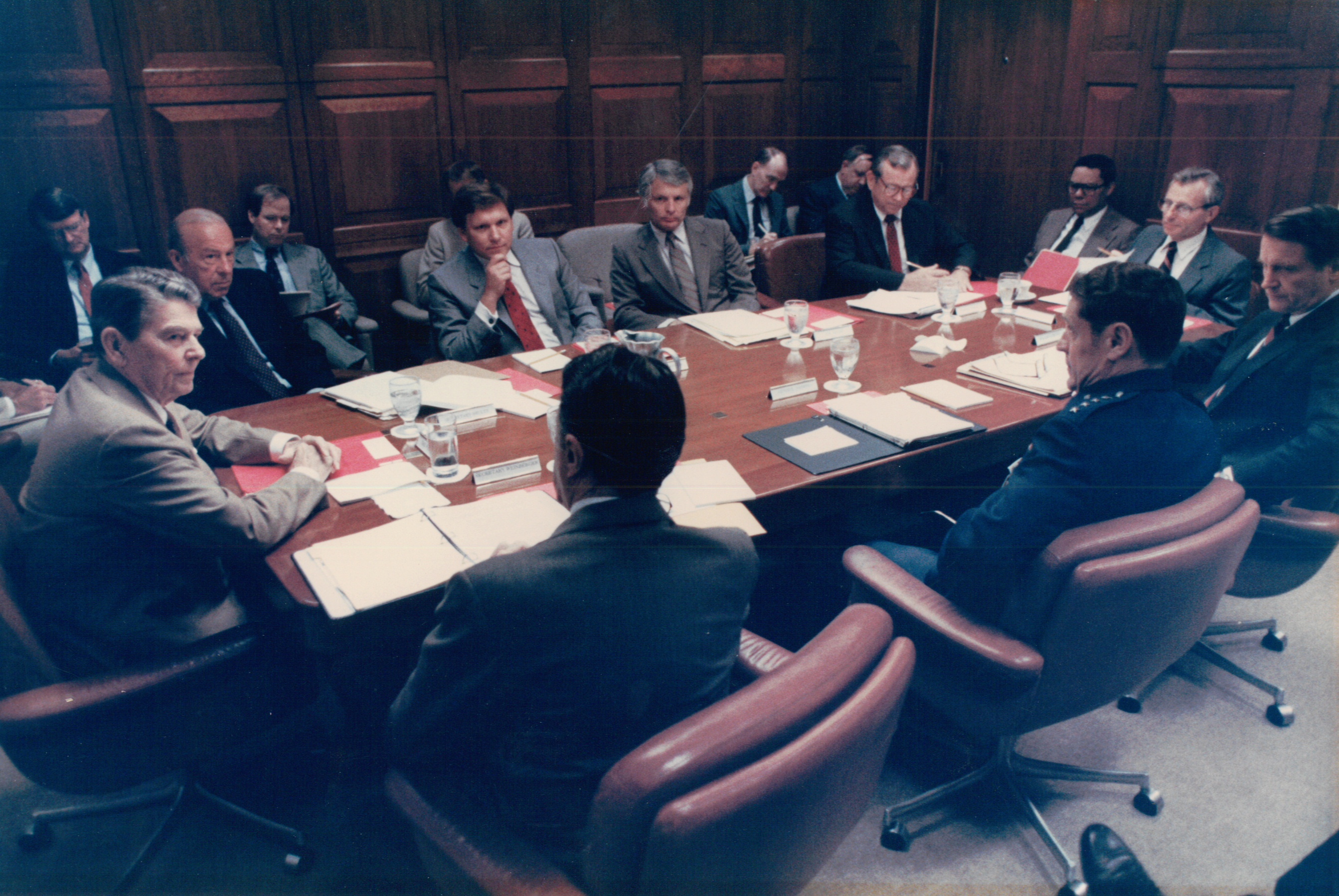
President Ronald Reagan's National Security Council. Participants include George Shultz, William F. Martin, Cap Weinberger, Colin Powell and Howard Baker.

The National Security Council was created in 1947 by the National Security Act. It was created because policymakers felt that the diplomacy of the State Department was no longer adequate to contain the Soviet Union in light of the tension between the Soviet Union and the United States. The intent was to ensure coordination and concurrence among the Army, Marine Corps, Navy, Air Force and other instruments of national security policy such as the Central Intelligence Agency (CIA), also created in the National Security Act.

In 1953, the Eisenhower administration's NSC wrote three policy papers on opposing the People's Republic of China. NSC 146 proposed backing Republic of China maritime raids and raids against mainland China. NSC 148 proposed to foster and support anti-communist Chinese elements both inside and outside of the country. NSC 166 proposed strategies to deny the PRC full status in the international community, pursuant to the view that making any concessions would strengthen the PRC.

In 2004, the position of director of national intelligence (DNI) was created, taking over the responsibilities previously held by the head of the CIA, the director of central intelligence, as a cabinet-level position to oversee and coordinate activities of the Intelligence Community

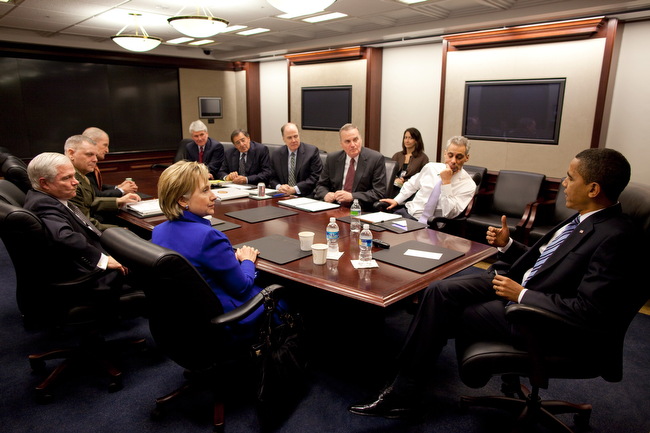
President Barack Obama at an NSC meeting in the Situation Room. Participants include Secretary of State Hillary Clinton, Secretary of Defense Robert Gates, National Security Advisor Gen. James L. Jones, Director of National Intelligence Dennis C. Blair, White House Counsel Greg Craig, CIA Director Leon Panetta, Deputy National Security Advisor Tom Donilon, Vice Chairman of the Joint Chiefs of Staff Gen. James Cartwright, and White House Chief of Staff Rahm Emanuel

On May 26, 2009, President Barack Obama merged the White House staff supporting the Homeland Security Council (HSC) and the National Security Council into one National Security Staff (NSS). The HSC and NSC each continue to exist by statute as bodies supporting the president. The name of the staff organization was changed back to National Security Council Staff in 2014.

The Directorate of Global Health Security and Biodefense was formed in 2016 under the Obama administration, disbanded in 2018 under the first Trump administration, and reinstated in January 2021 during the presidency of Joe Biden.

According to a White House memorandum in January 2017, the chairman of the Joint Chiefs of Staff and director of national intelligence will only sit on the Principals Committee as and when matters pertaining to them arise, but will remain part of the full National Security Council. The reorganization also placed the administrator of the United States Agency for International Development as a permanent member of the Deputies Committee, winning moderate praise.

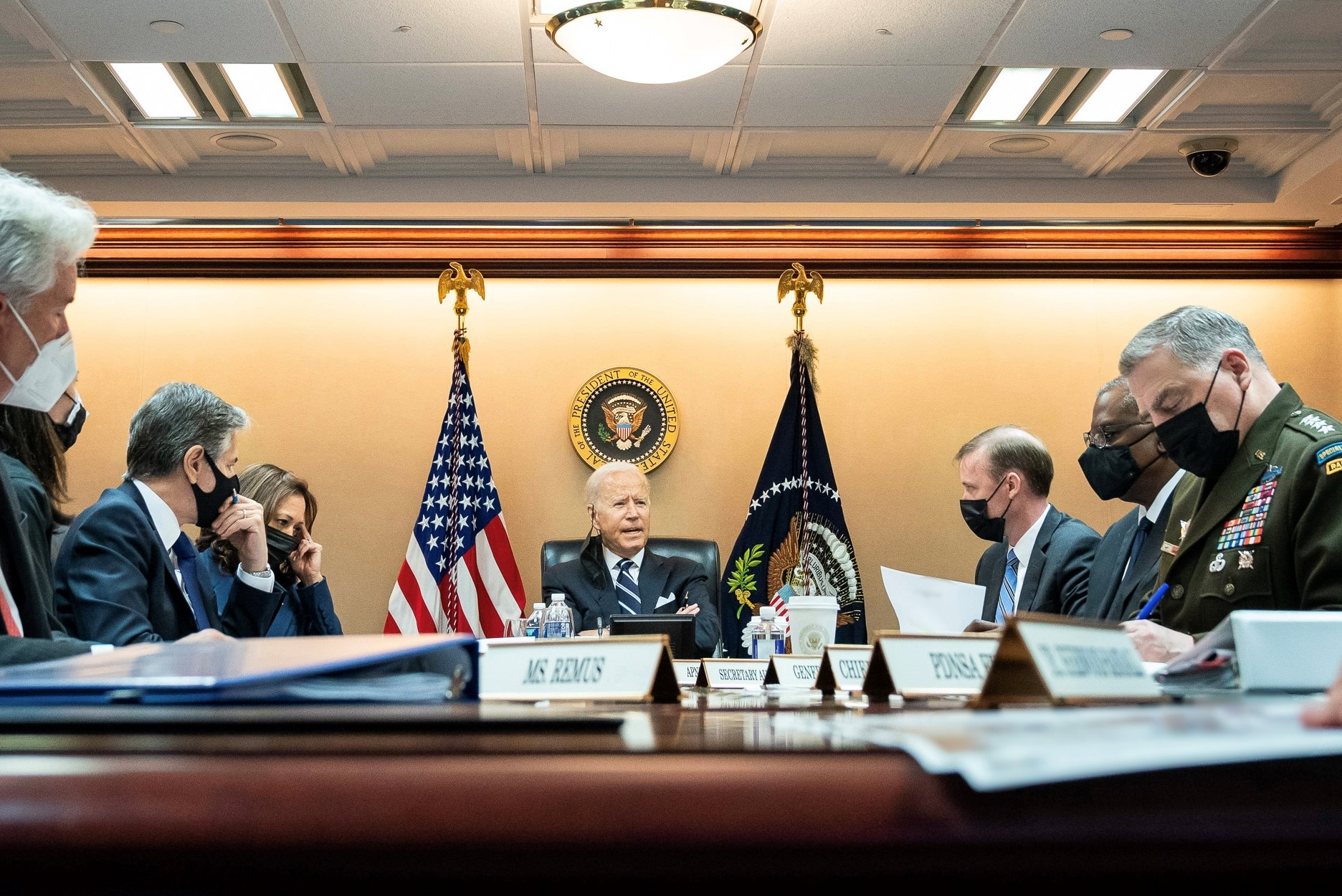
President Joe Biden discussing the Fall of Kabul with the National Security Council, August 18, 2021

On January 29, 2017, newly elected President Donald Trump restructured the Principals Committee (a subset of the full National Security Council), while at the same time altering the attendance of the chairman of the Joint Chiefs of Staff and director of national intelligence. According to "National Security Presidential Memorandum 2", the chairman of the Joint Chiefs of Staff and director of national intelligence were to only sit on the Principals Committee as and when matters pertaining to them arise, but will remain part of the full National Security Council. However, Chief of Staff Reince Priebus clarified the next day that they still are invited to attend meetings.

With "National Security Presidential Memorandum 4" in April 2017, the director of national intelligence and the chairman of the Joint Chiefs of Staff "shall" attend Principals Committee meetings and the director of the Central Intelligence Agency was included as a regular attendee. The reorganization also placed the administrator of the United States Agency for International Development as a permanent member of the Deputies Committee, while the White House chief strategist was removed.

According to a report by Reuters, the United States military ran a propaganda campaign to spread disinformation about the Sinovac Chinese COVID-19 vaccine, including using fake social media accounts saying that the Sinovac vaccine contained pork-derived ingredients and was therefore haram under Islamic law. The campaign was described as "payback" for COVID-19 disinformation by China directed against the U.S. The disinformation campaign began in 2020. In spring 2021, the NSC ordered the military to stop spreading anti-vaccine messages. The campaign continued until summer 2021 before terminating.

In August 2025, the Financial Times observed that "in Trump's second term, the NSC has been drastically pared back, with dozens of foreign policy and national security experts [having been] ousted from their jobs", and quoted an official with the assessment that "the traditional Washington foreign policy process led by the NSC has largely broken down in this administration."

== Authority and powers ==
The National Security Council was established by the National Security Act of 1947 (PL 235 – 61 Stat. 496; U.S.C. 402), amended by the National Security Act Amendments of 1949 (63 Stat. 579; 50 U.S.C. 401 et seq.). Later in 1949, as part of the Reorganization Plan, the council was placed in the Executive Office of the President.

The High Value Detainee Interrogation Group also reports to the NSC.

=== Kill authorizations ===
One of the tasks of the National Security Council is to determine and identify people, including United States citizens who are deemed to be threats to national security and add them to a "kill list". In this case, no public record of this decision or any operation to kill the suspect will be made available. The panel's actions are justified by "two principal legal theories": They "were permitted by Congress when it authorized the use of military forces against militants in the wake of the attacks of September 11, 2001; and they are permitted under international law if a country is defending itself."

Homeland Security Advisor John O. Brennan, who helped codify targeted killing criteria by creating the Disposition Matrix database, has described the Obama Administration targeted killing policy by stating that "in order to ensure that our counterterrorism operations involving the use of lethal force are legal, ethical, and wise, President Obama has demanded that we hold ourselves to the highest possible standards and processes".

Reuters reported that Anwar al-Awlaki, an American citizen, was on such a kill list and was killed accordingly.

== Membership ==
As of 2021, the NSC is chaired by the president, in accordance with statute and National Security Memorandum–2.

The other members are the vice president (statutory), the secretary of state (statutory), the secretary of the treasury (statutory), the secretary of defense (statutory), the secretary of energy (statutory), the Assistant to the president for National Security Affairs (Note: More commonly known as the "National Security Advisor")(non-statutory), the assistant to the president and director of the Office of Science and Technology Policy (non-statutory), the attorney general (non-statutory), the secretary of homeland security (non-statutory), and the representative of the United States to the United Nations (non-statutory).

The chairman of the Joint Chiefs of Staff is the military advisor to the council, the director of national intelligence is the intelligence advisor, and the director of national drug control policy is the drug control policy advisor. The chief of staff to the president, White House counsel, and the assistant to the president for economic policy are also regularly invited to attend NSC meetings. The attorney general, the director of the Office of Management and Budget and the director of the Central Intelligence Agency are also invited to attend meetings pertaining to their responsibilities. The heads of other executive departments and agencies, as well as other senior officials, are invited to attend meetings of the NSC when appropriate.

Structure of the United States National Security Council
| Chairman | President |
| Regular attendees | Vice President; Secretary of State; Secretary of Defense; Secretary of Energy; Secretary of the Treasury; Attorney General; Secretary of Homeland Security; Ambassador to the United Nations; White House Chief of Staff; National Security Advisor |
| Military advisor (and regular attendee) | Chairman of the Joint Chiefs of Staff |
| Intelligence advisor (and regular attendee) | Director of National Intelligence |
| Drug policy advisor | Director of National Drug Control Policy |
| Regular attendees | Deputy National Security Advisor; Homeland Security Advisor |
| Additional participants | White House Counsel; Director of the Central Intelligence Agency; Assistant to the President for Economic Policy; United States Trade Representative; Director of the Office of Management and Budget |

=== Principals Committee ===
The Principals Committee of the National Security Council is the Cabinet-level senior interagency forum for consideration of national security policy issues. The Principals Committee is convened and chaired by the national security advisor. The regular attendees of the Principals Committee are the secretary of state, the secretary of the treasury, the secretary of defense, the attorney general, the secretary of energy, the secretary of homeland security, the White House chief of staff, the director of national intelligence, the chairman of the Joint Chiefs of Staff, the director of the Central Intelligence Agency, the homeland security advisor, and the United States ambassador to the United Nations.

The White House counsel, the deputy counsel to the president for national security affairs, the director of the Office of Management and Budget, the deputy national security advisor, the deputy national security advisor for strategy, the national security advisor to the vice president, and the NSC executive secretary may also attend all meetings of the Principals Committee. When considering international economic issues, the Principals Committee's regular attendees will include the secretary of commerce, the United States trade representative, and the assistant to the president for economic policy.

=== Deputies Committee ===
The National Security Council Deputies Committee is the senior sub-Cabinet interagency forum for consideration of national security policy issues. The Deputies Committee is also responsible for reviewing and monitoring the interagency national security process including for establishing and directing the Policy Coordination Committees. The Deputies Committee is convened and chaired by the deputy national security advisor or the deputy homeland security advisor.

Regular members of the Deputies Committee are the deputy national security advisor for strategy, the deputy secretary of state, deputy secretary of the treasury, the deputy secretary of defense, the deputy attorney general, the deputy secretary of energy, the deputy secretary of homeland security, the deputy director of the Office of Management and Budget, the principal deputy director of national intelligence, the vice chairman of the Joint Chiefs of Staff, the national security advisor to the vice president, the administrator of the United States Agency for International Development, and the deputy director of the Central Intelligence Agency. Invitations to participate in or attend specific meetings are extended to deputy or under secretary level of executive departments and agencies and to other senior officials when relevant issues are discussed. The executive secretary and the deputy White House counsel also attend. The relevant senior director on the National Security Council staff is also invited to attend when relevant.

=== Policy Coordination Committees ===
The Policy Coordination Committees of the National Security Council, established and directed by the Deputies Committee, are responsible for the management of the development and implementation of national security policies through interagency coordination. Policy Coordination Committees are the main day-to-day for interagency coordination of national security policy development, implementation and analysis in aide of the Deputies Committee and the Principals Committee. Policy Coordination Committees are chaired by senior directors on the National Security Council staff, or sometimes National Economic Council staff, with assistant secretary–level officials from the relevant executive department or agency acting as co-chairs.

=== Directorate of Global Health Security and Biodefense ===
The Directorate of Global Health Security and Biodefense was created by President Barack Obama in 2016 in response to the 2014 Ebola outbreak. Its goal was "to prepare for the next disease outbreak and prevent it from becoming an epidemic or pandemic." The directorate was disbanded when a May 2018 change in organizational structure by John Bolton, Trump's recently appointed head of the National Security Council, resulted in the effective elimination of the office then led by Rear Admiral Tim Ziemer, Sr. Director for Global Health Security and Biothreats. Remaining staff were moved to other NSC departments, prompting Ziemer's resignation, thus completing the elimination of the office.

The responsibilities that formerly belonged to the directorate, along with those of arms control and nonproliferation, and of weapons of mass destruction terrorism, were absorbed into a single new directorate, counterproliferation and biodefense, and assigned to Tim Morrison in July 2018 as director. Morrison characterized the consolidation as part of an overall NSC "reduction of force" and called it "specious" to say the office was "dissolved", describing the previous size of the organization as "bloat", and stating "That is why Trump began streamlining the NSC staff in 2017." Trump defended the 2018 cuts, describing the financial motivation, when questioned in a February 2020 press conference, suggesting that people on a pandemic response team are unnecessary between pandemics, saying "Some of the people we cut, they haven't been used for many, many years." No source of information could be found to support the president's statement, likely because the team was created in 2016 and disbanded in 2018. He continued: "And rather than spending the money—and I'm a business person—I don't like having thousands of people around when you don't need them." The size of the team before cuts was estimated at 430 people, but the "thousands" referenced by the president also included reduction in the staff numbers of the CDC.

In January 2021, the directorate was reinstated by President Joe Biden, who appointed Elizabeth Cameron as Senior Director for Global Health Security and Biodefense, a position she had previously held under the Obama administration and briefly under the Trump administration.

=== New members ===
During his presidential transition, President-elect Joe Biden announced the creation of the position of U.S. Special Presidential Envoy for Climate, the occupant of which was to be a member of the National Security Council. Former Secretary of State John Kerry served as the first envoy.

=== United States Office of Shipbuilding ===
Proposed in president Donald Trump's speech to a joint session of Congress on March 4, 2025, the United States Office of Shipbuilding was a government office, to be developed at the United States National Security Council. Trump announced the office as part of a comprehensive executive order designed to reinvigorate the United States' shipbuilding sector, as a means of competing against China's dominant position in the global maritime industry. Measures associated with the office and development of the sector included increasing wages for shipyard workers, and employing the Department of Government Efficiency towards reviewing procurement actions.

== See also ==
- Homeland Security Council
- National Coordinator for Security, Infrastructure Protection and Counter-Terrorism
- National Security Medal
- Targeted killing
- Title 32 of the Code of Federal Regulations
- Tower Commission
