= Judson Welliver Society =

The Judson Welliver Society is a bipartisan social club composed exclusively of former presidential speechwriters in the United States. The group is named after Judson C. Welliver, the "literary clerk" to President Warren Harding, usually credited as being the first presidential speechwriter.

Group meetings are usually held after major presidential speeches, such as the State of the Union. Active members have included William Safire (a Nixon writer who often hosted meetings), Jack Valenti who was a veteran of the Johnson administration, Pat Buchanan (Nixon and Reagan), David Gergen (Nixon, Ford, Reagan, and Clinton), Tony Snow (speechwriter for George H. W. Bush and press secretary for George W. Bush), Michael Waldman (Clinton), George Stephanopoulos (Clinton), James Fallows (Carter), Chris Matthews (Carter), Hendrik Hertzberg (Carter), Anthony R. Dolan (Reagan), Michael Gerson (George W. Bush), and Clark Clifford, who wrote speeches for Harry Truman.

At times the meetings had sixty persons in attendance. Other notables were writers Robert Hartmann, who worked for Gerald Ford, James Keogh who worked for Nixon, and Theodore Sorensen and Arthur M. Schlesinger, Jr. who worked for Kennedy.
