= Judson Welliver =

American journalist and presidential speechwriter (1870–1943)

Judson C. Welliver
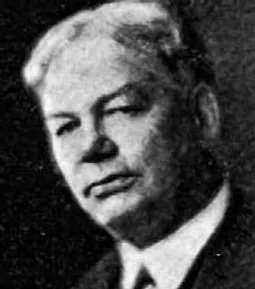
- Born: August 13, 1870; Aledo, Illinois
- Died: April 14, 1943 (aged 72); Philadelphia, Pennsylvania
- Occupations: Newspaper journalist, presidential speechwriter
- Known for: Widely regarded as the first presidential speechwriter

Judson Churchill Welliver (August 13, 1870 – April 14, 1943) (Note: Welliver's middle initial is sometimes erroneously given as "T".) was a "literary clerk" to President Warren G. Harding and is usually credited as being the first presidential speechwriter. (Note: It is argued by some that Alexander Hamilton was the first presidential speechwriter since he wrote some material for George Washington, but Hamilton was a cabinet member rather than a person hired expressly for the job of writing speeches.)

== Biography ==
Judson Welliver was born on August 13, 1870, in Aledo, Illinois.

He married his wife, Jane Douglas Hutchins, on July 3, 1899. They had four children—Edward M., Allan J., Sarah H., and Jane Douglas.

By 1909, Welliver had earned a reputation as "one of the most able journalists in the country". He worked variously at the Fort Dodge Messenger, the Sioux City Journal, and the Des Moines Leader before becoming the editor of the Sioux City Tribune, a position which he held until 1904. That year, Wellington joined the staff of the Washington Times, where he was noted for his support of the Progressives. He wrote articles for McClure's Magazine and Hampton's during the muckraker period.

He was sent to Europe by President Roosevelt in 1907 to report on the waterway and railroad systems of Europe and Great Britain. (The report was published in 1908.) He managed London correspondence and European news for the New York Sun from 1917 until 1918.

Welliver handled publicity for Harding during his 1920 presidential campaign, and began working as a "literary clerk" to President Harding on March 4, 1921. Welliver left his speech-writing position at the White House on November 1, 1925 (under the presidency of Calvin Coolidge), accepting a position at the American Petroleum Institute for a better salary. After he resigned from the American Petroleum job in 1927, Welliver went on to become editor of the Washington Herald in 1928. He was also assistant to the president of the Pullman Company from 1928 to 1931.

Welliver died of cancer in Philadelphia on April 14, 1943, at the age of 72.

The Judson Welliver Society, a bipartisan social club composed of former presidential speechwriters, is named in his honor.

== Notes and references ==
Notes
