= Horace Busby =

American publicist and consultant (1924–2000)

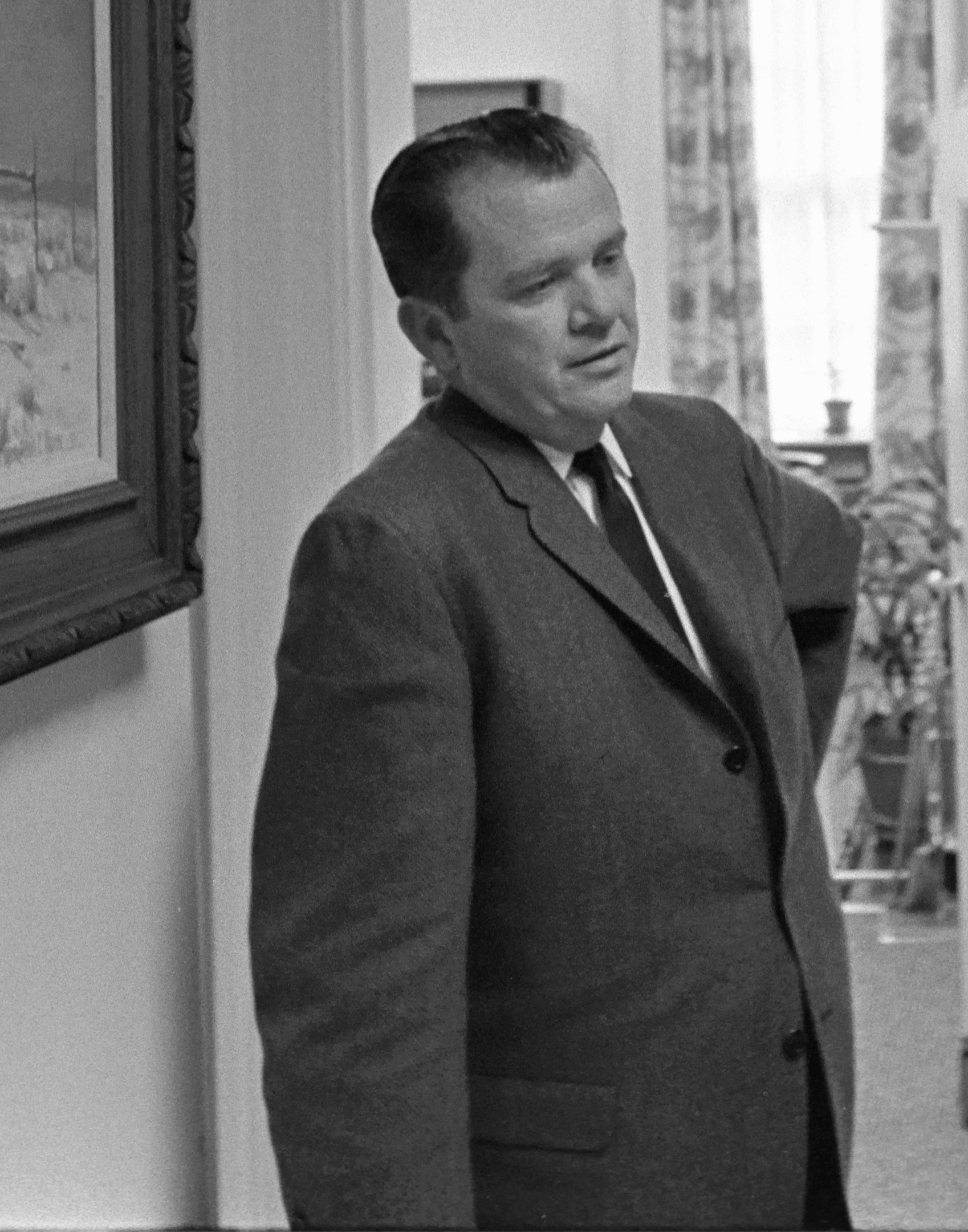

Personal details
- Born: Horace Wooten Busby Jr. March 10, 1924 Fort Worth, Texas, U.S.
- Died: May 31, 2000 (aged 76) Santa Monica, California, U.S.
- Party: Democratic
- Education: University of Texas, Austin (attended)

Horace Wooten "Buzz" Busby Jr. (March 10, 1924 – May 31, 2000) was an American opinion journalist, speechwriter, consultant, and public relations expert. He was considered one of Lyndon B. Johnson's closest confidants before and during Johnson's term as President of the United States.

== Early life ==
Horace Busby was born on March 10, 1924 in Fort Worth, Texas. He had one brother (Eldon B.) and one sister (Willie Mae). His father Horace Wooten Busby was a preacher and evangelist of the Church of Christ, who was active in many states in the United States, but particularly in Texas and Oklahoma. Horace Wooten Busby Jr.'s great-grandfather was among the elders of the Cumberland Presbyterian Church. His mother Viola Mae, née Wise (1886–1967), was also an evangelical Christian.

== Education ==
Horace Busby first attended Lorenzo de Zavala Eighth Ward Elementary School in Fort Worth. During the second half of the 1930s, he was a junior high school student. During this time, he suffered from asthma and other illnesses for two years, which made it impossible for him to attend school. However, he successfully took the exams. While still at school, he developed a keen interest in domestic politics, which at the time was dominated by Franklin Delano Roosevelt's New Deal, and in international politics. He followed politics through Time, Life and the radio. He graduated from Fort Worth's Paschal High School in June 1941.

From 1941 to 1946, he studied at the University of Texas at Austin without graduating. He had influence as editor of the student newspaper The Daily Texan while in college. Busby, who revered Roosevelt, showed, a clearly liberal profile and defended academic freedom. The background to this was, in particular, the dismissal of Homer P. Rainey in November 1944. The president of the University of Texas had stood up for reform-minded professors who had been dismissed by the university administration in 1942 because they had spoken out in favor of New Deal programs. In addition, Rainey had protested attempts to ban the reading of certain books at the university.

== Professional activities ==
After graduating from high school, he worked temporarily at a Fort Worth radio station.

After leaving the university, he worked from 1947 to 1948 as a journalist for the news agency International News Service. From mid-March 1948 he worked for Lyndon B. Johnson, shortly before the latter decided to run for a post in the U.S. Senate. This was the beginning of a collaboration in which Busby, also called Buzz by friends, often "served as LBJ's other self". Johnson made Busby a member of his team after winning the election. When Johnson became chairman of the new subcommittee established in 1950 to deal with the readiness of U.S. armed forces (Armed Services Preparedness Subcommittee), Busby was among his assistants and served as editor of reports from that Senate panel.

In 1953, Busby worked for Price Daniel, also a senator for the state of Texas; from 1954 to 1957, he operated as a freelance consultant and publicist with offices in Austin, Texas, and Washington, D.C. Cooperation with Johnson became closer again when Busby advised the Senate Armed Services Committee particularly on matters relating to the U.S. space program. This committee was chaired by Johnson.

During the period of Johnson's vice presidency (1961–1963) Busby accompanied him on his trips abroad. It was Busby who rounded out the text of the speech Johnson delivered on the Gettysburg Battlefield on May 30, 1963, 100 years after Abraham Lincoln's Gettysburg Address, to urge progress on civil rights for African Americans.

From November 1963 to September 1965, he served as Special Assistant to the President and secretary of the cabinet He took a leading part in the writing of a series of speeches delivered by Lyndon Johnson as U.S. president. These included speeches concerning the Great Society, Johnson's domestic reform program. Among the important speeches were also Let Us Continue, Johnson's first address as the 36th president of the United States on Nov. 27, 1963, five days after the assassination of his predecessor, John F. Kennedy, further, the televised address in which Johnson, on March 31, 1968, announced a halt to the bombing of North Vietnam and that he would not seek reelection. Already on January 14, 1968, the President had confidentially informed Busby that he would not be available for another term.

After 1969, he worked in Washington as a management consultant, political analyst, and publisher. He edited the newsletters The American Businessman and The Busby Papers, among others. Among the clients of his management consultancy were Mobil Oil and American Airlines.

== Private life ==
Horace Busby was married to Mary Virginia Alves, but they were later divorced. He had one son (Scott), two daughters (Betsy and Leslie) and a granddaughter (Eleonora). He was preceded in death by another granddaughter (Blythe). Like Johnson, Busby was a heavy smoker. In 1997, he moved to Santa Monica, California. He died there three years later.

== Publications ==
- The thirty-first of March. An intimate portrait of Lyndon Johnson's final days in office. Farrar, Straus and Giroux, New York 2005, ISBN 978-0-374-27574-7.
- Reflections on a Leader. In: Kenneth W. Thompson (Hrsg.): The Johnson presidency. Twenty intimate perspectives of Lyndon B. Johnson. Lanham, Md, University Press of America, 1987, ISBN 0-8191-5554-3, pp. 251–270.
