= Walter Shapiro =

American journalist (1947–2024)

- Born: February 16, 1947; New York City, U.S.
- Died: July 21, 2024 (aged 77); New York City, U.S.
- Education: University of Michigan (BA)
- Occupation: Columnist
- Political party: Democratic
- Spouse: Meryl Gordon

Walter Elliot Shapiro (February 16, 1947 – July 21, 2024) was an American journalist, columnist, writer, and author. He was the Press Secretary for the U.S. Secretary of Labor and a speech writer for President Jimmy Carter. Shapiro was also a staff writer for The New Republic.

== Early life and education ==
Walter Elliot Shapiro was born in Manhattan, New York City, in 1947, raised in Norwalk, Connecticut, and graduated from Brien McMahon High School in 1965. One of his great-grandfathers was a Jewish immigrant from Prussia.

Shapiro attended the University of Michigan, where he was an editor of The Michigan Daily; he earned his B.A. in history in 1970. Shapiro also started a master's at Michigan in European history; as a graduate student in 1972, he ran unsuccessfully for the U.S. House of Representatives, finishing second in a six-way Democratic primary election.

== Career ==
Shapiro began his journalism career as Washington reporter for Congressional Quarterly (1969 to 1970). He later wrote for a number of publications, including USA Today (serving as twice-weekly "Hype & Glory" columnist starting in 1995); The Washington Post, Time (senior writer from 1987 to 1993, covering Bill Clinton's 1992 presidential campaign), Newsweek (political writer, 1983 to 1987), Esquire (monthly "Our Man in the White House" column, 1993 to 1996), the Washington Monthly (editor, 1972 to 1976), Salon.com, and Politics Daily. Shapiro also wrote for The American Prospect and had been a columnist for Yahoo News and Roll Call. Shapiro won the Society of Professional Journalists' 2010 Sigma Delta Chi Award in the category of Online Column Writing (Independent) for his piece "The Societal Costs of Our Shrill, Hyperactive and Partisan Media Culture," published in Politics Daily.

Shapiro was press secretary to U.S. Secretary of Labor Ray Marshall from 1977 to 1978. He was a speechwriter for President Jimmy Carter in 1979. He covered nine United States presidential elections.

Shapiro completed a fellowship in Japan with the Japan Society and had been a member of the Council on Ideas of the Gihon Foundation since 1992.

Shapiro was a fellow at New York University's Brennan Center for Justice and he was also a lecturer in political science at Yale University.

Shapiro wrote One-Car Caravan: On the Road with the 2004 Democrats Before America Tunes In (PublicAffairs, 2003) and Hustling Hitler: How a Jewish Vaudevillian Fooled the Fuhrer (Blue Rider Press, 2016).

Shapiro performed stand-up comedy for many years, and in 1998 The Times of London described him as "one of Manhattan's leading political satirists". His columns have included satire as well.

== Personal life and death ==
Shapiro was married to magazine writer Meryl Gordon and split his time between New York City and Washington, D.C. He died from complications of cancer at a hospital in Manhattan on July 21, 2024, aged 77.
