= Let Us Continue =

1963 speech by U.S. President Lyndon B. Johnson

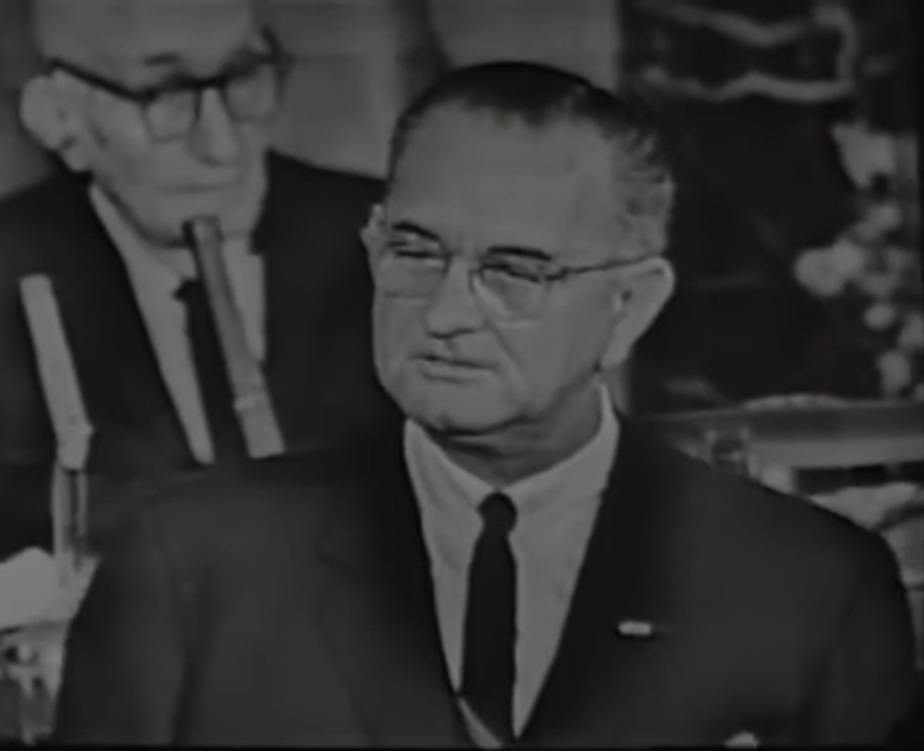
- Lyndon B. Johnson delivering the speech
- Date: November 27, 1963
- Duration: 25 minutes
- Venue: United States Capitol
- Location: Washington, D.C.; 38°53′23″N 77°00′32″W
- Type: Speech
- Participants: President Lyndon B. Johnson
- An excerpt from the speech where Johnson says "Let Us Continue".

"Let Us Continue" is a speech that 36th President of the United States Lyndon B. Johnson delivered to a joint session of Congress on November 27, 1963, five days after the assassination of his predecessor John F. Kennedy. The almost 25-minute speech is considered one of the most important in his political career.

After Kennedy's assassination, Johnson, until then Vice President, ascended to the presidency. To publicly emphasize stability by the continuity of government, Johnson made efforts to persuade key people from the Kennedy administration to stay in office. Subsequently, various Kennedy officials, including his brother and Attorney General Robert F. Kennedy, stayed in the Cabinet. Former President Dwight D. Eisenhower had a conversation with Johnson in the Executive Office Building, and in a confidential memorandum, he suggested that Johnson call a joint session of the Congress and deliver a speech. Soon after, Johnson asked Ted Sorensen, Kennedy's chief speechwriter, to prepare a draft version for his speech. Input about the subject matter and content of the speech came from various advisers, including John Kenneth Galbraith.

It was decided to broadcast the speech on television on November 27. After at least nine draft versions, Johnson studied the final version that same morning, making a few minor changes. In his address, he called Kennedy the "greatest leader of our time", and said that "American dreams have been vitalized by his drive and by his dedication." He called for the earliest possible passage of the civil rights law, and demanded that Congress pass tax reform that would bring tax relief. In contrast with Kennedy's 1961 inauguration address' focus on a new beginning, Johnson said "Today, in this moment of new resolve, I would say to all my fellow Americans, let us continue." He closed the speech with a stanza from "America the Beautiful".

The speech was interrupted 34 times by applause from the audience. It was widely appreciated, and the New York Herald Tribune described his address as "fine words, fitting words, at times inspiring words". Soon after his address, Johnson succeeded in getting the tax reform bill and the Civil Rights Act passed by Congress.

== Accession to the presidency ==
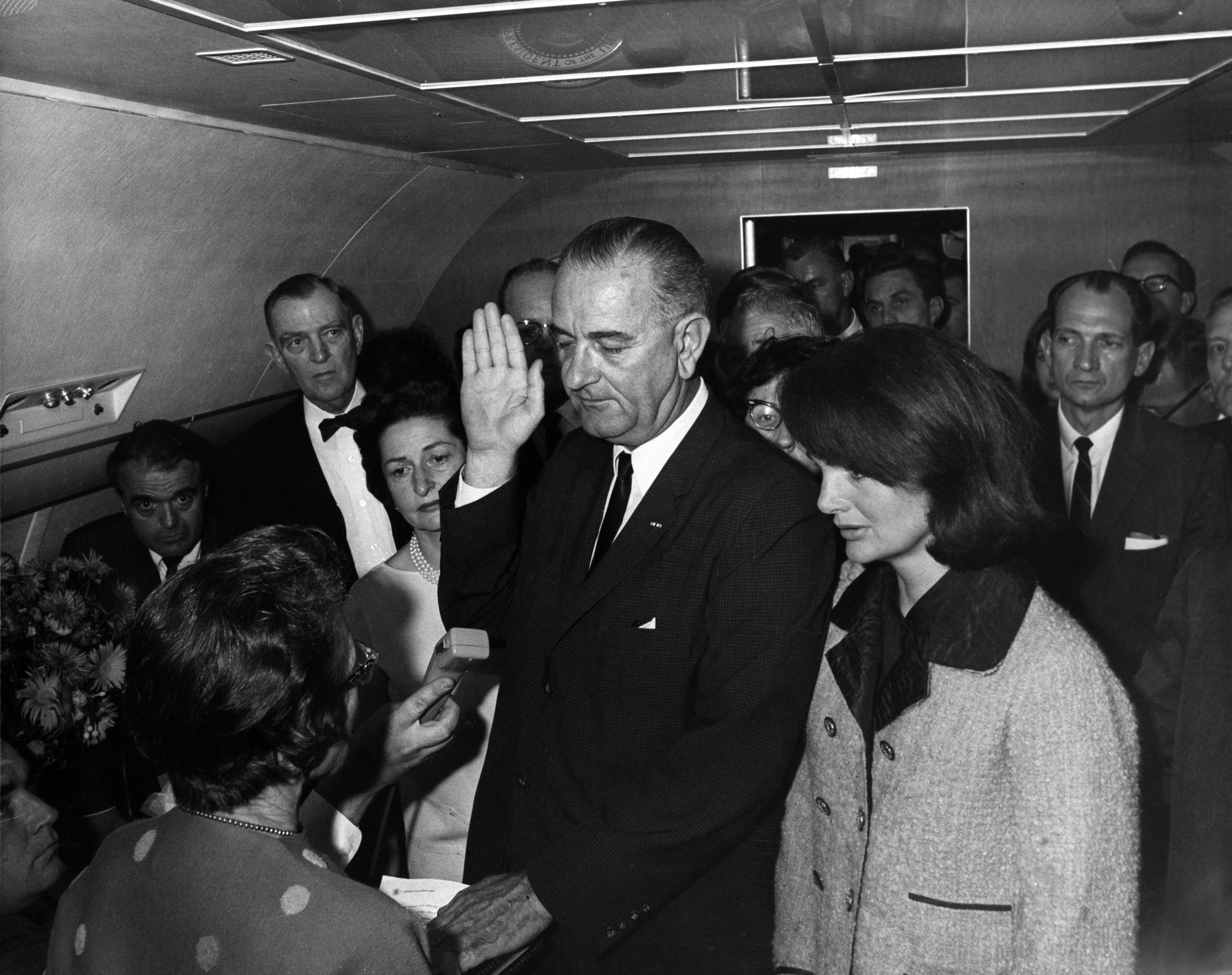
Lyndon B. Johnson at his swearing-in, with Jacqueline Kennedy at his left

On November 22, 1963, President John F. Kennedy was assassinated in Dallas, Texas, at about 12:30 p.m. CST. Upon his death, Vice President Lyndon B. Johnson succeeded to the presidency. Johnson took the oath of office aboard Air Force One. After the plane landed at Andrews Air Force Base near Washington, D.C., he gave a brief address to the public, which lasted less than 40 seconds. Kennedy's widow Jacqueline Kennedy, his brother Robert F. Kennedy, and his children remained at the center of media and public attention in the following days, particularly during the funeral ceremonies on November 25, 1963.

Johnson, who had fallen into political isolation with his vice-presidency, was systematically pushed aside by many of Kennedy's advisers. Following the assassination, immediately upon his arrival at his official vice-presidential residence at the Executive Office Building, Johnson spoke with Everett Dirksen, the Republican leader in the Senate, and with John W. McCormack, the Democratic speaker of the House of Representatives. In the following days, he held telephone calls and meetings with various union leaders and representatives of the civil rights movement including Martin Luther King Jr. and Whitney Young. Johnson also contacted the opinion leaders of political liberalism and conservatism in Congress. He asked for support and help in the task of leading the United States out of the crisis that had been caused by Kennedy's assassination. He also pursued this intention on November 25, 1963, when he met with state governors. To publicly emphasize stability by the continuity of government work, Johnson made efforts to persuade key people from the Kennedy administration to stay in office. Subsequently, prominent Kennedy advisers and cabinet members including Robert McNamara, Dean Rusk, McGeorge Bundy, Ted Sorensen, Pierre Salinger, and Adlai Stevenson II continued in their official positions. Even Robert F. Kennedy, who had been associated with Johnson in mutual dislike since their first meeting, was persuaded to continue his duties as the Attorney General.

== Preparation for the speech ==
All three presidents who were still living at the time pledged their support to Johnson. Former President Harry S. Truman advised him from his own experience of assuming the presidency upon his predecessor Franklin D. Roosevelt's death, while former President Dwight D. Eisenhower arrived in Washington, D.C., and had a conversation with Johnson in the Executive Office Building. In a confidential memorandum, Eisenhower suggested to Johnson to call a joint session of the Congress and deliver a speech of around 12 minutes. Concluding his memorandum, Eisenhower wrote: "You hope that people of government and the entire nation may now mobilize their hearts, their hands and their resources for one purpose—to increase the spiritual and material resources of the nation and to advance her prestige and her capacity for leadership in the world for peace."

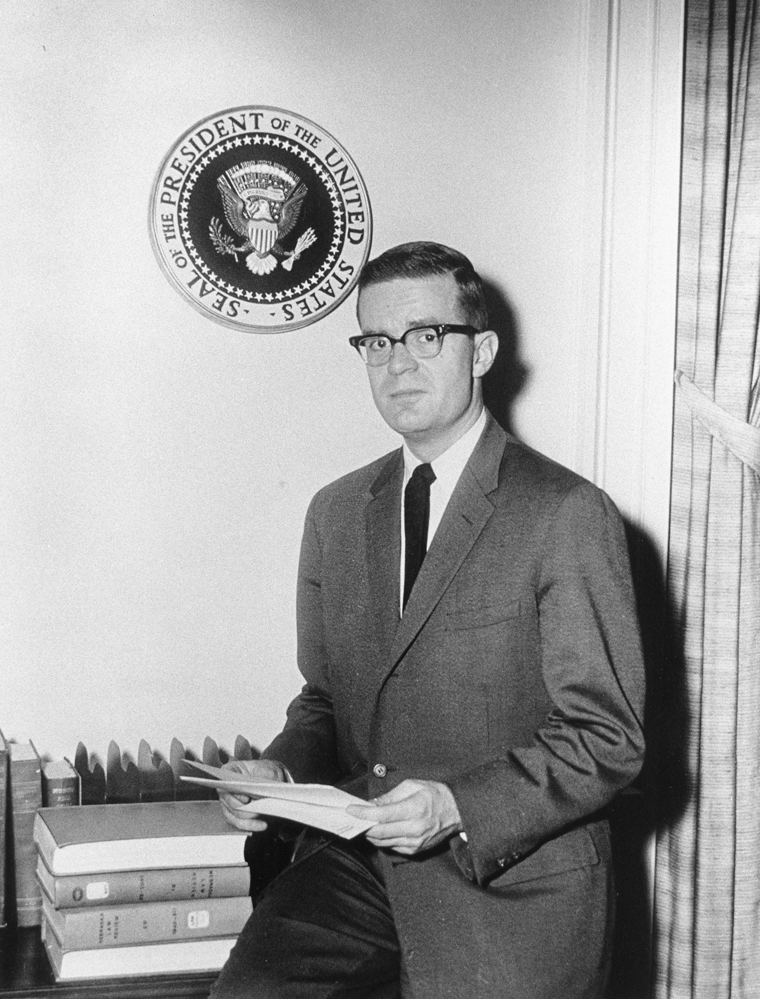
Ted Sorensen

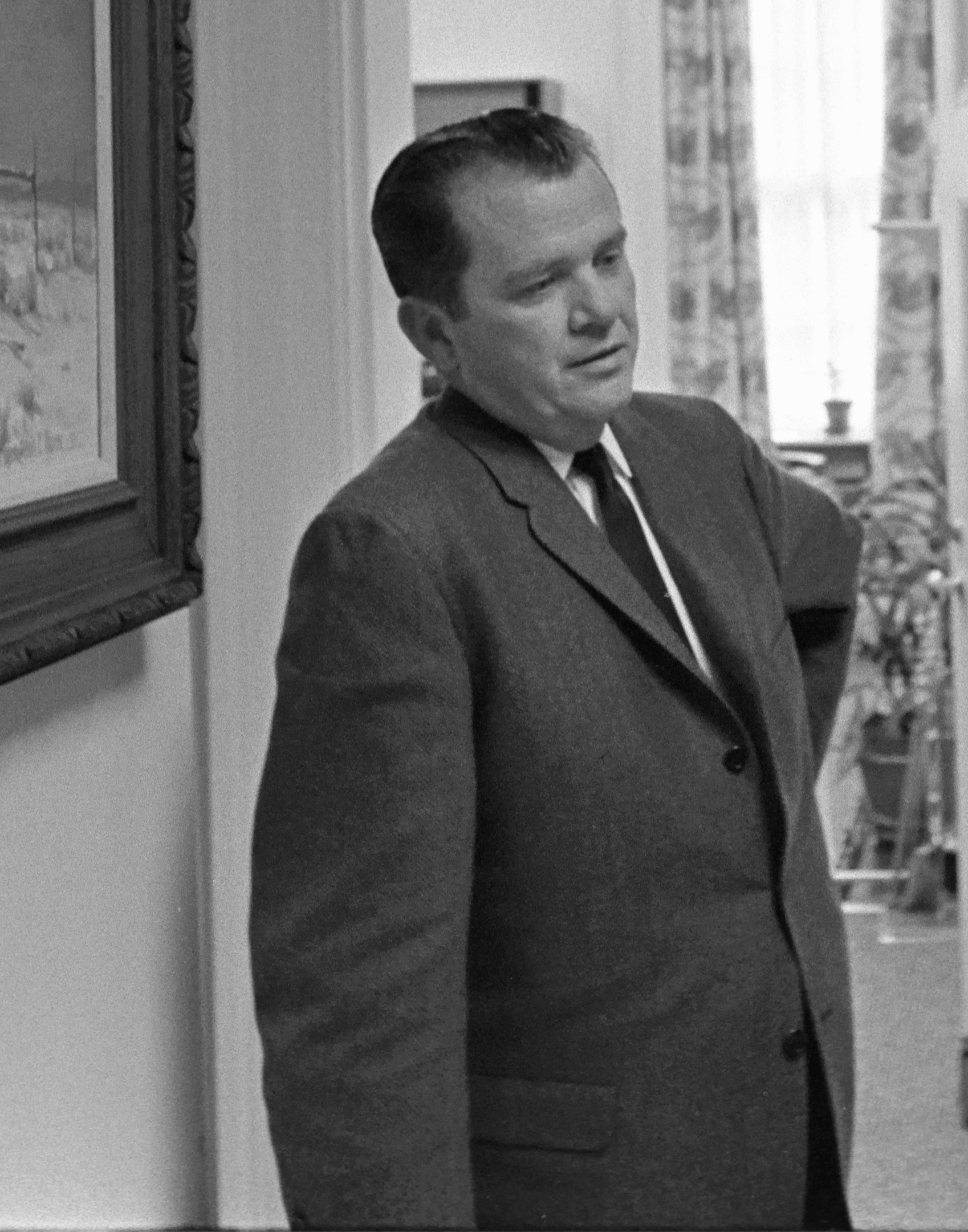
Horace Busby

Soon after, Johnson asked Ted Sorensen, Kennedy's chief speechwriter, to prepare a draft version for his speech. Initially, several cabinet members and White House staff suggested that Johnson address the nation from the Oval Office. However, after Eisenhower's memorandum, Johnson felt that the Capitol seemed suitable for the speech, as he had served long as a senator, and was often referred to as "Master of the Senate". On the afternoon of November 23, it was decided that Johnson would address the Congress on November 27. On November 25, Johnson attended Kennedy's state funeral, and met with various foreign dignitaries including Lester Pearson, the prime minister of Canada; Hayato Ikeda, the prime minister of Japan; Anastas Mikoyan, the deputy premier of the Soviet Union; Alec Douglas-Home, the prime minister of the United Kingdom; and Charles de Gaulle, the president of France. A day before the funeral, Lee Harvey Oswald, the man accused of killing President Kennedy was fatally shot by nightclub operator Jack Ruby. Johnson put together a team to develop speech drafts, which included Sorensen, John Kenneth Galbraith, McGeorge Bundy, Horace Busby, and Bill Moyers. Several other advisers provided essential ideas and thoughts for the planned speech; inputs came from Abe Fortas (a lawyer and friend of Johnson), Senator Hubert Humphrey, Senator Mike Mansfield, Dean Rusk, Douglas Dillon, Adlai Stevenson, Orville Freeman, and Kermit Gordon. Author Merle Miller wrote that "everybody knew it would be the most important speech of Johnson's career." Many Americans did not know Johnson, and he felt that it was necessary to establish a trust and sense of leadership. Johnson initially agreed to the draft version presented to him by Galbraith; however, on November 25, Sorensen vehemently opposed Galbraith's draft as it presented Johnson in a deprecatory way. Subsequently, Sorensen presented a draft that paid tribute to Kennedy and seemed like his personal obituary. In his versions of the draft, Johnson remained in the shadow of his predecessor and was presented as someone who would implement the ideas of his predecessor, but was unwilling to take on independent and hands-on leadership.

Based on useful elements from Sorensen's draft, Senator Humphrey, Abe Fortas, Walter Jenkins, Jack Valenti, Moyers, and Busby provided the synthesis and fine-tuning on the night of November 26. In a memorandum to the secretary of state, the United States ambassador to the United Nations Adlai Stevenson expressed his concern for the draft and asserted that it had not sufficiently echoed Kennedy's foreign policy philosophy, including his support for the United Nations. This was subsequently added to the draft, but it appeared briefly in Johnson's address. Remembering Kennedy's 1961 inaugural speech in which Kennedy said "Let Us Begin", Busby suggested and inserted the formative words "Let Us Continue" on November 26.

Public speaking was not one of Johnson's strengths. According to Ashley Barrett, his "thick [S]outhern accent often took away from the content of his messages, distracting some listeners and agitating others". During his tenure as the vice president, Johnson began to place more emphasis on his public speaking skills, although he feared that he could not compete with Kennedy's oration. It was decided to broadcast the speech on television. Awaiting answers about Kennedy's assassination, it was estimated that Americans watched television on average between eight and ten hours a day. The allusion to Kennedy's words became an instrument for highlighting Johnson's leadership, which pushed for action, especially the political implementation of programs and legislation that had come to a complete standstill. Busby made sure that Johnson did not disappear behind Kennedy, but as a political leader calling on his countrymen to "fulfill the destiny that history has set for us". Johnson had insisted on addressing civil rights prominently the evening before the speech, but advisers considered this topic detrimental because progress could not be achieved in the Congress due to the obstruction policy of Southern politicians. In response, Johnson asked, "What the hell's the presidency for?" After at least nine draft versions, Johnson studied the final version on the morning of November 27. A few lines, including a request for a moment of silence, and a couple of paragraphs describing America's status as a "good society" were omitted from the final draft. Johnson also removed references to "liberal" and "conservative" from the speech, which read: "We must not mask the magnitude of challenge before us for fear of being called 'liberal', just as we must not accept unnecessary programs for fear of being called 'conservative'". Johnson made only minor changes and added hints where he, in danger of speaking too quickly, planned a pause. Underscores marked the words he wanted to emphasize.

== Address to the joint session ==
"Let Us Continue"
President Johnson's address to the joint session

Manuscript of the speech in the National Archives and Records Administration

The speech opened with Johnson being introduced to members of the joint session by John W. McCormack, the speaker of the House of Representatives. Johnson began with his tribute to President Kennedy and his work. He said: "All I have I would have given gladly not to be standing here today." He called Kennedy the "greatest leader of our time", and emphasized at the outset that no word was sad enough to gauge the grief that Kennedy's assassination had caused. He continued,

The dream of conquering the vastness of space—the dream of partnership across the Atlantic—and across the Pacific as well—the dream of a Peace Corps in less developed nations—the dream of education for all of our children—the dream of jobs for all who seek them and need them–the dream of care for our elderly—the dream of an all-out attack on mental illness—and above all, the dream of equal rights for all Americans, whatever their race or color—these and other American dreams have been vitalized by his drive and by his dedication. [sic?]

Johnson then declared his intention to maintain continuity in foreign policy. It was followed by a passage devoted primarily to domestic policy. He said: "This Nation will keep its commitments from South Vietnam to West Berlin." He then asked the members of Congress to decide on tax reform and a bill to reduce racial discrimination. He asked all Americans for their help, saying: "An assassin's bullet has thrust upon me the awesome burden of the Presidency. I am here today to say I need your help; I cannot bear this burden alone." Referring to Kennedy's 1961 inaugural address, he said:

On the 20th day of January, in 1961, John F. Kennedy told his countrymen that our national work would not be finished 'in the first thousand days, nor in the life of this administration, nor even perhaps in our lifetime on this planet'. But, he said, 'let us begin'. Today, in this moment of new resolve, I would say to all my fellow Americans, let us continue.

Johnson called for the swift passage of the civil rights legislation that Kennedy had supported during his presidency. He emphasized that equal rights had been spoken of for some time without political action: "It is time now to write the next chapter, and to write it in the books of law. All traces of discrimination and oppression based on race or skin color should be eliminated." He also demanded that Congress pass a tax reform that would bring tax relief. The tax reform was conceived in the spirit of a supply-oriented economic policy. He said: "As one who has long served in both Houses of the Congress, I firmly believe in the independence and the integrity of the legislative branch. And I promise you that I shall always respect this ... With equal firmness, I believe in the capacity and I believe in the ability of the Congress, despite the divisions of opinions which characterize our Nation, to act--to act wisely, to act vigorously, to act speedily when the need arises." Johnson was aware that such demands could give the appearance of disregarding the autonomy of Congress. He countered this impression by asserting that he firmly believed in the independence and integrity of the legislature, and he assumed that the Congress was capable of intelligent, energetic, and immediate action. He emphasized: "The need is here. The need is now. I ask your help."

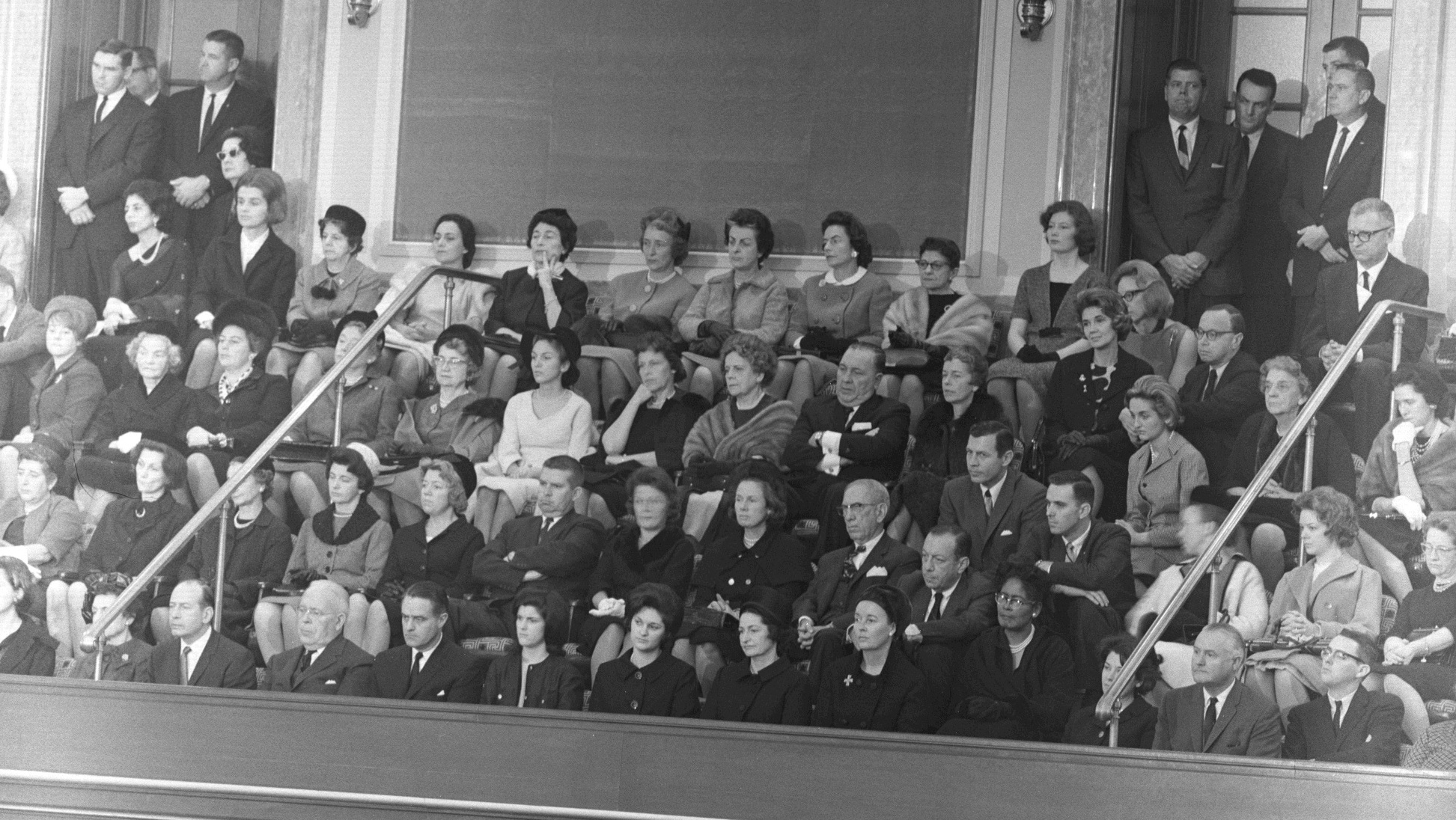
Lady Bird Johnson, her daughters Lynda and Luci, and other people in the family box during the speech.

Johnson's call for action was expressed in the speech by the frequent use of the term "action", which he used 10 times. He had already repeatedly asked for help in talks with representatives of various interest groups and with individuals. He also used repetitions in other parts of the speech to convey his message. This stylistic device was used right at the beginning of the speech when Johnson spoke that "Kennedy lives on in the immortal words and works that he left behind." Also at the beginning, he used the means of repetition when he recalled the political dreams that Kennedy had begun to realize: "The dream of conquering the vastness of space ..." Towards the end of his speech, he alluded to a phrase from Abraham Lincoln's famous Gettysburg Address of 1863: "So let us here highly resolve that John Fitzgerald Kennedy did not live – or die – in vain." He closed the speech with a stanza from "America the Beautiful", saying:

And on this Thanksgiving eve, as we gather together to ask the Lord's blessing, and give Him our thanks, let us unite in those familiar and cherished words:

America, America,
God shed His grace on thee,
And crown thy good With brotherhood
From sea to shining sea.

== Evaluation and legacy ==
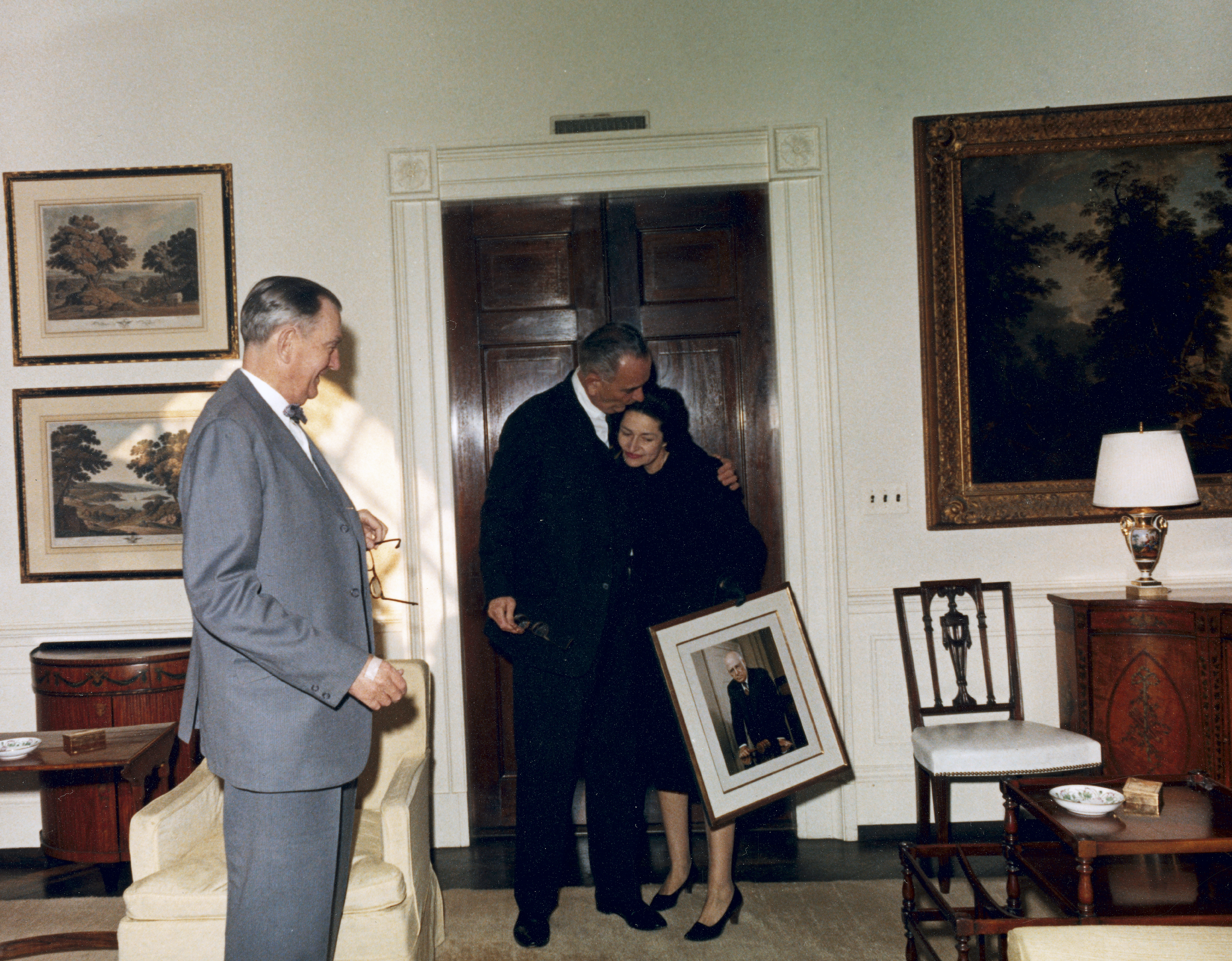
President Johnson and Lady Bird Johnson entering the White House, Dec 7, 1963

Johnson's speech was interrupted 34 times by applause from the audience. Apart from the members of Congress, his wife Lady Bird Johnson, and his daughters; government members and advisers, Supreme Court justices, members of the Joint Chiefs of Staff, foreign diplomats, and many members of the press were also present. The applause was longest and loudest when Johnson called on Congress to swiftly pass a civil rights bill. Strong applause also followed towards the end of Johnson's speech, when he called for national and political cohesion across all differences. His listeners finally reacted with standing ovations after he had finished his speech, referring back to song-lines from "America the Beautiful" – very slowly, with feeling, in a soft, almost breaking voice. However, not all Congress members applauded during the speech. Republicans held back in many moments. In particular, no Southern politicians applauded Johnson's call for a civil rights bill.

Various newspapers, including The New York Times, The Washington Post, and the Boston Herald praised the speech. The New York Herald Tribune described his address as: "fine words, fitting words, at times inspiring words. As he stood before Congress and the nation, not a fluke of history but a president." In the following weeks, various letters and telegrams to the White House showed that the speech was also received positively outside the press. The echo in the international press of Western Europe, Latin America (including Cuba), and the Middle East was also favorable. Robert Dallek judged that few other factors had contributed more to the successful transfer of power than this speech. Robert A. Caro called the speech a "triumph".

Soon after his address, Johnson succeeded in getting the long-blocked budget, including a tax reform bill, passed by Congress. Immediately thereafter, efforts began to push through the Civil Rights Act, which succeeded despite considerable resistance from Southern politicians in July 1964. Polls showed high approval ratings for Johnson. Between March and May 1964, his approval rose from 70 to 77 percent.

== See also ==
- Presidency of Lyndon B. Johnson
- Lyndon B. Johnson 1964 presidential campaign
- War on Poverty

== Works cited ==
Books and journals

- Barrett, Ashley (2009). "Lyndon B. Johnson, 'Let Us Continue'" (PDF). Voice of Democracy (4 ed.). pp. 97–119.
- Bornet, Vaughn Davis (1988). The Presidency of Lyndon B. Johnson. University Press of Kansas. ISBN 978-0-7006-0237-7. LCCN 83012560. OL 19536837M.
- Caro, Robert A. (2012). The Passage of Power. Alfred A. Knopf. ISBN 978-0-679-40507-8. LCCN 2012010752. OL 25270398M.
- Dallek, Robert (1998). Flawed Giant: Lyndon Johnson and his times, 1961–1973. Oxford University Press. ISBN 978-0-19-505465-1. LCCN 97039084. OL 691919M.
- Dallek, Robert (2004). Lyndon B. Johnson: Portrait of a President. Oxford University Press. ISBN 978-0-19-515920-2. LCCN 2003011360. OL 3675369M.
- Gittinger, Ted; Fisher, Allen (2004). "LBJ Champions the Civil Rights Act of 1964". Prologue. Vol. 36, no. 2.
- Goodwin, Doris Kearns (1976). Lyndon Johnson and the American Dream. Signet Press. ISBN 978-0-233-96839-1. OCLC 1173459482.
- Hall, Robert N. (1965). "Lyndon Johnson's Speech Preparation". Quarterly Journal of Speech. 51 (2): 168–176. doi:10.1080/00335636509382715.
- Johnson, Lyndon B. (1964). A Time For Action: A Selection From the Speeches and Writings of Lyndon B. Johnson, 1953–64. Atheneum Publishers. OL 5914145M.
- Johnson, Lyndon B. (1971). The Vantage Point: Perspectives of the Presidency, 1963–1969. Rinehart and Winston. ISBN 978-0-03-084492-8. LCCN 74102146. OL 5075564M.
- Kiewe, Amos (1994). The Modern presidency and crisis rhetoric. Greenwood Publishing Group. ISBN 978-0-275-94176-5. LCCN 92037528. OL 1732834M.
- Miller, Merle (1980). Lyndon, an Oral Biography. G. P. Putnam's Sons. ISBN 978-0-399-12357-3.
- Unger, Irwin (1999). LBJ: A Life. Wiley. ISBN 978-0-471-17602-2. OL 7612846M.
- Witherspoon, Patricia D. (1987). "'Let Us Continue:' The Rhetorical Initiation of Lyndon Johnson's Presidency". Presidential Studies Quarterly. 17 (3). Center for the Study of the Presidency and Congress: 531–539. JSTOR 27550444.
- Woods, Randall B. (2007). LBJ: Architect of American Ambition. Harvard University Press. ISBN 978-0-674-02699-5. OL 9504067M.

Other sources

- History.com (February 9, 2010). "Jack Ruby kills Lee Harvey Oswald". History. A&E Television Networks.
- Johnson, Lyndon B. (November 22, 1963). Remarks at Andrews AFB following the Assassination of John F. Kennedy (Television broadcast. via – YouTube). Originally recorded by CBS News. Lyndon Baines Johnson Library and Museum.
- Pace, Eric (June 3, 2000). "Horace Busby, 76, Ex-White House Aide and Johnson Adviser". The New York Times.
- Johnson, Lyndon B. (November 27, 1963). Peters, Gerhard; Woolley, John T. (eds.). "Address Before a Joint Session of the Congress". Lyndon Baines Johnson Library and Museum. The American Presidency Project.
- Tofel, Richard J. (May 9, 2008). "In His Own Words". The Wall Street Journal.
- "Inaugural Address". John F. Kennedy Presidential Library and Museum.
- "Lyndon B. Johnson: Master of the Senate". United States Senate.
- Tallerico, Brian (May 20, 2016). "All the Way". RogerEbert.com.
