= Sioux City Tribune =

The Sioux City Tribune was a newspaper serving Sioux City, Iowa from the late nineteenth into the mid-twentieth century.

== History ==
The Tribune was formed out of the Sioux City Daily and Weekly Times, a paper which had been founded in May 1869 by a stock company. In 1874, a Mr. Warner purchased the Daily and Weekly Times, made it politically Democratic and changed the name to the Tribune. Warner stepped down as editor in 1876, with C.R. Smead taking the helm. Albert Watkins was the next editor. Watkins continued the publication of the paper until July 1, 1880, when he handed it over to John C.Kelly, its editor and proprietor until at least the year 1882. At that time, the Tribune was a six-column quarto format newspaper.

Judson Welliver was editor until 1904. Having been dissolved and reestablished by 1929, the Tribune merged with the Sioux City Journal in 1941 to form the Sioux City Tribune and Journal. This successor title eventually ceased printing in 1959 or 1960 under the name of the Journal–Tribune.
