= Operation Crooked Code =

FBI investigation of Chicago corruption

Operation Crooked Code is a federal investigation into the corruption surrounding the City of Chicago's Department of Building and Zoning. As of September 2009, Operation Crooked Code had resulted in charges against more than two dozen individuals, 13 of them city inspectors charged with bribery and bribery-related crimes. The investigation is spearheaded by Patrick J. Fitzgerald, the United States Attorney in Chicago, with lead prosecutors Assistant U.S. Attorneys Juliet Sorensen, April Perry and Christopher Hotaling. As of September 2009, the investigation had netted 12 convictions.

The Federal Bureau of Investigation, City of Chicago Inspector General's Office, and United States Postal Inspection Service participated in the investigation of the Zoning and Building Departments Bribery Case. Among the agents was Thomas Simon. The evidence against the defendants includes recordings made by cooperating informants and a court-authorized wiretap on the developer Beny Garneata, who pleaded guilty and was sentenced to two years in prison in September 2009. Cooperating informants include a city inspector and an expediter, who acted as a "bagman" for developers to pay bribes in exchange for approval of building projects.

In announcing the arrests of 15 individuals as part of the Crooked Code investigation in May 2008, U.S. Attorney Patrick J. Fitzgerald said, "The picture painted by the criminal charges filed today shows sadly that the permit process in Chicago is governed by a separate set of rules for those who pay to corrupt the system. These charges also show that last year's arrests did not change the system enough. It didn't stop the bribery. It just changed how the bribery was done; they got sneakier. Today's charges put on notice everyone who would think about paying, receiving, arranging or delivering a bribe that they will be caught and, when they are, will face jail."

The arrests and charges of the 15 defendants were announced by Patrick J. Fitzgerald, United States Attorney for the Northern District of Illinois; Thomas P. Brady, Postal Inspector-in-Charge of the U.S. Postal Inspection Service in Chicago; Robert D. Grant, Special Agent-in-Charge of the Chicago Office of the Federal Bureau of Investigation, and David Hoffman, Inspector General for the City of Chicago. The 15 defendants held positions including property owners, developers, contractors, and seven City of Chicago inspectors. Nine were charged with one count of conspiracy to commit bribery while the remaining six defendants were charged with one count of bribery. In seven of these cases, defendants solicited help from a cooperating witness. Through this witness, a longtime businessperson who takes permit applications and other construction issues to the city on behalf of homeowners and developers, defendants were able to pay or receive bribes without physically presenting themselves.

Former Chicago Inspector General David H. Hoffman said: "Taxpayers pay city inspectors to enforce the law. Instead, the city employees charged today used their position to help people violate the law. For thousands of dollars in bribes, they wrote false inspection reports and issued fraudulent certificates. Our building safety and zoning laws become meaningless when corrupt city employees help real-estate developers break the laws."
