= Robert Orben =

American writer and magician (1927–2023)

- Born: March 4, 1927; New York City, U.S.
- Died: February 2, 2023 (aged 95); Alexandria, Virginia, U.S.

Comedy career
- Years active: 1946–2023
- Medium: Books
- Genre: Observational comedy
- Subject: American culture

Robert Orben (March 4, 1927 – February 2, 2023) was an American professional comedy writer and magician. He wrote multiple books on comedy, mostly collections of gags and "one-liners" originally written for his newsletter, Orben's Current Comedy, and also wrote books for magicians. Later, Orben moved into politics, and in 1973 he became head speechwriter to Vice President Gerald R. Ford.

Orben died at a nursing home in Alexandria, Virginia, on February 2, 2023, at the age of 95.
