= Juliet Sorensen =

American lawyer

Juliet Sorensen (born 1972/1973) is an American lawyer. She is a clinical professor of law at Loyola University Chicago School of Law and serves as the director of Loyola's Rule of Law Institute and Rule of Law for Development Program. Previously, she was a member of the clinical faculty at Northwestern University Pritzker School of Law, where she was associated with its Center for International Human Rights.

== Early life ==
Born to Theodore C. Sorensen, former special counsel to President John F. Kennedy, and Gillian M. Sorensen of the United Nations Foundation, Sorensen graduated from Princeton University and Columbia Law School.

== Career ==
Between 1995 and 1997, Sorensen volunteered with the Peace Corps in Morocco.

She served as assistant U.S. attorney in Chicago from 2003 to 2010. She prosecuted City of Chicago inspectors as part of Operation Crooked Code, a bribery investigation into the Chicago building and zoning departments. She prosecuted Jean-Marie Vianney ("Zuzu") Mudahinyuka, a leader of the Rwandan genocide, in a case cited as a success of the U.S. Immigration and Customs Enforcement No Safe Haven initiative against human rights violators.

In March 2009, the United States Court of Appeals for the Seventh Circuit, in a unanimous panel opinion written by Judge Richard Posner, found that Sorensen had engaged in prosecutorial misconduct and made "a series of improper statements" which the Court labeled "false and misleading." In the trial court case of U.S. v. Farinella, which was appealed as 558 F.3d 695, a jury had found a Chicago businessman guilty of fraud and misbranding for relabeling 1.6 million bottles of salad dressing to extend their "best when purchased by" date, then reselling the bottles. Posner found that although relabeling "best when purchased by" dates was not a crime, Sorensen's improper argument would have required reversal in any case.

== Personal life ==
Sorensen married economist Benjamin Jones on August 19, 2000.

== See also ==
- Comprehensive planning
- Interahamwe
- Operation Crooked Code
- Peace Corps
- Rwandan genocide
