= Benjamin Jones (economist) =

American economics researcher

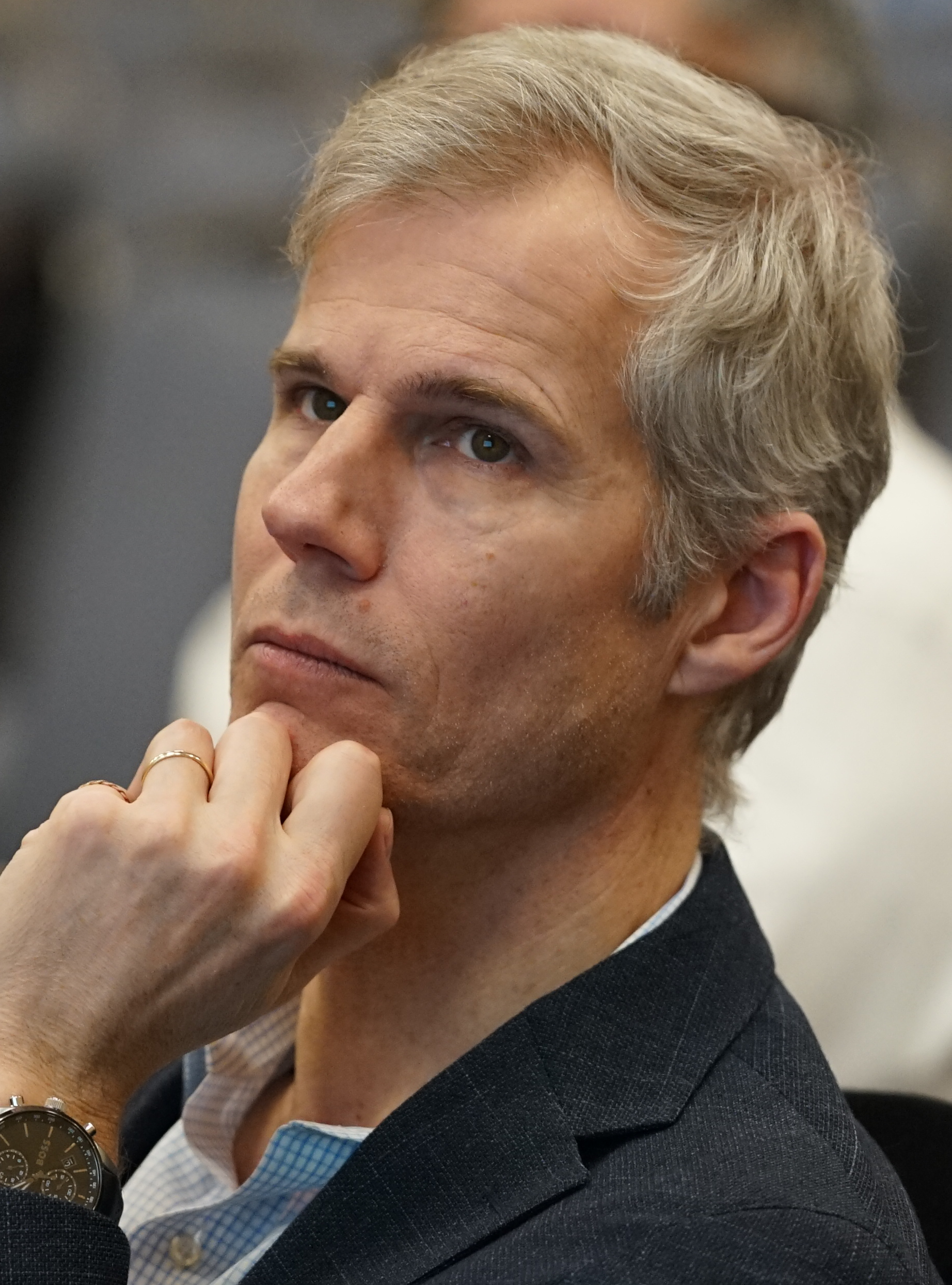
- Jones at ASSA 2026
- Born: 1972 (age 53–54)
- Occupations: Economist, researcher, academic
- Title: Gordon and Llura Gund Family Professor in Entrepreneurship
- Spouse: Juliet Sorensen (m. 2000)

Academic background
- Education: Princeton University; Oxford University; Massachusetts Institute of Technology
- Doctoral advisor: Abhijit Banerjee; Sendhil Mullainathan; Daron Acemoglu

Benjamin Felt Jones (born 1972) is an American economist and professor at the Kellogg School of Management, Northwestern University. Jones's research is mainly focused on innovation and economic development. He has worked as an economic advisor in the U.S. Treasury and the White House.

== Education and early career ==
Jones graduated from Princeton University in 1995 with a B.S.E in Aerospace Engineering. He received there the Pyne Prize. Jones was then a Rhodes Scholar at Magdalen College, Oxford University, receiving an MPhil in Economics in 1997. In 1996, he taught at the Kazakhstan Institute for Management and Economic Progress before returning to the United States.

From 1997 to 1998, Jones worked as Special Assistant to Lawrence Summers at the U.S. Department of Treasury. Jones received a Ph.D. in economics from MIT in 2003, studying under doctoral advisors Daron Acemoglu, Abhijit Banerjee, and Sendhil Mullainathan.

== Career ==
After completing his Ph.D., Jones joined the Kellogg School of Management, becoming the Gordon and Llura Gund Family Professor in Entrepreneurship in 2014. He has been a courtesy member of Northwestern University's political science department since 2005 and affiliated with the National Bureau of Economic Research since 2005. In 2013, he was appointed as Faculty Director of Kellogg Innovation and Entrepreneurship Initiative. He is also affiliated with the Brookings Institution.

Jones served as the Senior Economist for Macroeconomics at the White House Council of Economic Advisers during 2010 and 2011.

== Research and work ==
In the beginning of his career, Jones's research was focused on innovation, national leadership, and economic growth. Towards the late 2000s, his research expanded to consider how factors like climate and education impact the wealth and poverty of nations. The relationship between age and breakthrough innovations is another recurring topic in his research.

=== Burden of knowledge ===
In 2005, in a paper entitled 'The Burden of Knowledge and the 'Death of the Renaissance Man': Is Innovation Getting Harder?', Jones presented the Burden of Knowledge theory. This theory considers what happens if the advance of scientific and technological knowledge imposes an increasing educational burden on successive generations of innovators. This theory has been used to explain numerous shifts in the nature of innovation, including the rising age at which scientists and inventors make major contributions, rising specialization and teamwork in science and invention, and the increasing difficulty of advancing productivity growth in the economy.

=== Impact of climate on economic development ===
Another strand of Jones's research deals with the relationship between temperature and economic development (and the direction of the relationship's causality). In this research, together with Benjamin Olken and Melissa Dell, Jones found that higher temperatures severely reduce economic growth in developing countries, lowering both agricultural and industrial output and provoking political instability, thus overall suggesting large negative impacts of higher temperatures on developing countries. These conclusions have been challenged as relying on "an untenable method of classifying countries by income." Furthermore, in other work, Dell, Jones and Olken also found that a large part of the strongly negative impact of high temperatures on income may be offset by adaptation in the long run. These and other results are summarized and discussed in these authors' highly cited review of the economics of climate change, What Do We Learn from the Weather?

=== Human capital and economic development ===
Jones's research has also focused on the role of human capital in explaining the wealth and poverty of nations. His work has disrupted a prior consensus, where researchers had concluded that human capital was of minor importance, and shown instead that human capital differences may explain several phenomena in world economy, including large portions of the vast gap in per-capita income between rich and poor countries.

== Personal life ==
Jones married lawyer Juliet Sorensen on August 19, 2000.

== Awards ==
- 1995 - Princeton University's Pyne Honor Prize & Palmer Prize in Engineering
- 1995 - Rhodes Scholarship
- 2001 - SSRC Program in Applied Economics Fellowship
- 2007 - Templeton Foundation Grant
- 2009 - Excellence in Refereeing Award, American Economic Review
- 2011 - Stanley Reiter Best Paper Award
- 2015 - Best African Business Case, EFMD
- 2015 - Alfred P. Sloan Foundation Grant (2015–2018)
- 2018 - Excellence in Refereeing Award, American Economic Review
- 2018 - Minerva Research Initiative Grant (2019–2023)

== Selected publications ==
=== Books ===
- The Changing Frontier: Rethinking Science and Innovation Policy (2015)

=== Articles ===
- Do Leaders Matter? National Leadership and Growth since World War II, Quarterly Journal of Economics, 120 (3), August 2005 (with Ben Olken)
- The Increasing Dominance of Teams in the Production of Knowledge, Science, 316, May 2007 (with Brian Uzzi and Stefan Wuchty)
- The Burden of Knowledge and the Death of the Renaissance Man: Is Innovation Getting Harder? Review of Economic Studies, 76 (1), January 2009
- Atypical Combinations and Scientific Impact, Science, 342, October 2013 (with Satyam Mukherjee, Mike Stringer, and Brian Uzzi)
- What Do We Learn from the Weather? The New Climate-Economy Literature, Journal of Economic Literature, 52 (3), September 2014 (with Melissa Dell and Ben Olken)
- The Human Capital Stock: A Generalized Approach, American Economic Review, 104 (11), November 2014
