= Gillian Sorensen =

American United Nations advisor

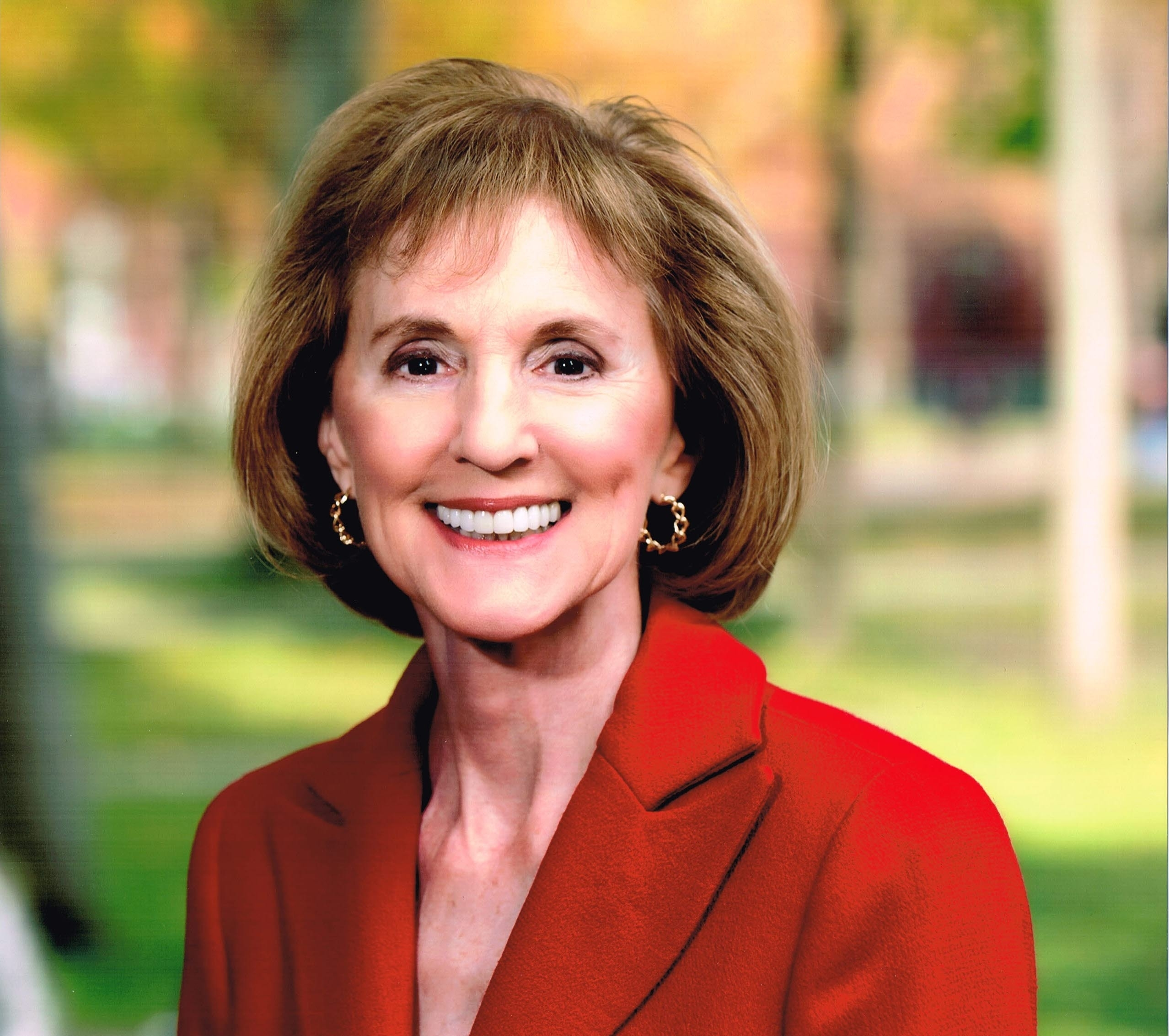
Gillian Sorensen in 2015

Gillian Sorensen is a former United Nations assistant secretary-general for external relations who works with groups and organizations committed to peace, justice, development, refugees, and human rights. In 2018 she addressed the National Model United Nations (NMUN), attended by students from over 130 countries.

Sorensen serves as a member of the board of the International Rescue Committee and as a member of the Council on Foreign Relations.

== Early life and education ==
Sorensen grew up in Michigan, the daughter of parents who were active in politics and civic affairs.

She is a graduate of Smith College and studied at the Sorbonne. She has twice been an Institute of Politics Fellow at the John F. Kennedy School of Government at Harvard University.

== Personal life ==
Gillian Sorensen (née Martin) is the widow of Theodore C. Sorensen, who served as President John F. Kennedy's speechwriter and as Special Counsel to the President in the White House. They are the parents of a daughter, Juliet Sorensen.
