= Ted Sorensen =

American lawyer and presidential adviser (1928–2010)

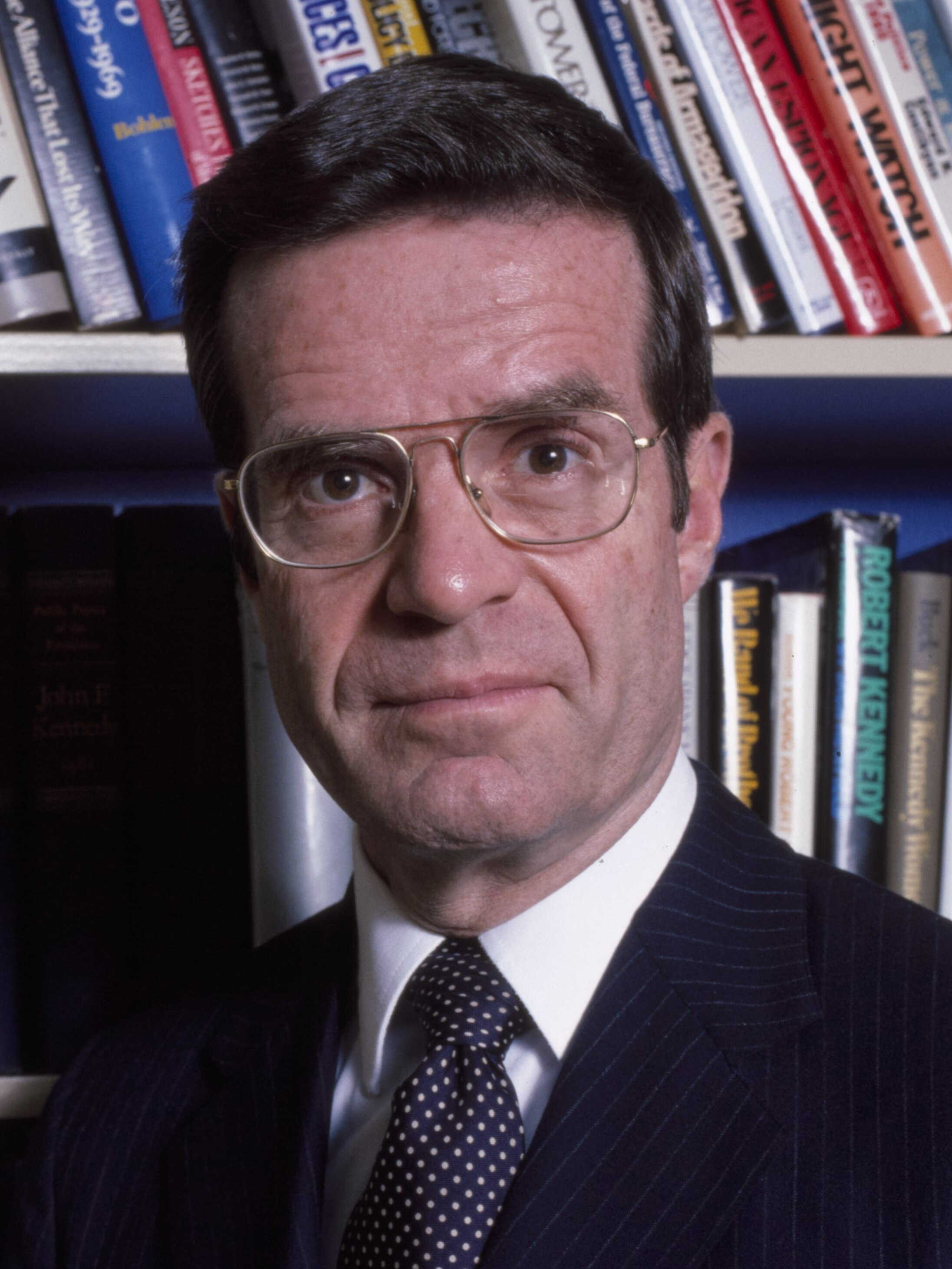
- Sorensen in 1983

White House Counsel
- In office January 20, 1961 – February 29, 1964
- President: John F. Kennedy; Lyndon Johnson
- Preceded by: David Kendall
- Succeeded by: Mike Feldman

Personal details
- Born: Theodore Chaikin Sorensen; May 8, 1928 Lincoln, Nebraska, U.S.
- Died: October 31, 2010 (aged 82) New York City, New York, U.S.
- Party: Democratic
- Spouse(s): Camilla Palmer (1949, divorced); Sara Elbery (1964, divorced); Gillian Martin (1969)
- Children: 4, including Juliet
- Relatives: Christian A. Sorensen (father); Philip Sorensen (brother)
- Education: University of Nebraska, Lincoln (BA, LLB)

Theodore Chaikin Sorensen (May 8, 1928 – October 31, 2010) was an American lawyer, writer, and presidential adviser. He was the primary speechwriter for President John F. Kennedy, as well as one of his closest advisers. President Kennedy once called him his "intellectual blood bank".

With Sorensen's assistance, Kennedy penned Profiles in Courage, for which he won the 1957 Pulitzer Prize for Biography. He also assisted in Kennedy's inaugural address; wrote the majority of his 1962 address to Rice University (known for the phrase "We choose to go to the Moon"); and drafted Lyndon Johnson's "Let Us Continue" speech following Kennedy's assassination.

== Early life and education ==
Ted Sorensen was born in Lincoln, Nebraska, the son of Christian A. Sorensen (1890–1959), who served as Nebraska attorney general (1929–1933), and Annis (Chaikin) Sorensen. His father was Danish-American, and his mother was of Russian-Jewish descent.

Ted's younger brother, Philip Sorensen, later became lieutenant governor of Nebraska.

Ted graduated from Lincoln High School in 1945. He earned a bachelor's degree at the University of Nebraska, Lincoln, and attended the University of Nebraska College of Law, graduating first in his class.

In January 1953, 24-year-old Sorensen became the chief legislative aide to Senator John F. Kennedy. He wrote many of Kennedy's articles and speeches. In his 2008 autobiography, Counselor: A Life at the Edge of History, Sorensen said he wrote "a first draft of most of the chapters" of Kennedy's 1956 book Profiles in Courage and "helped choose the words of many of its sentences."

== Career ==
=== Kennedy administration ===
External videos
- After Words interview with Sorensen on Counselor, June 14, 2008, C-SPAN

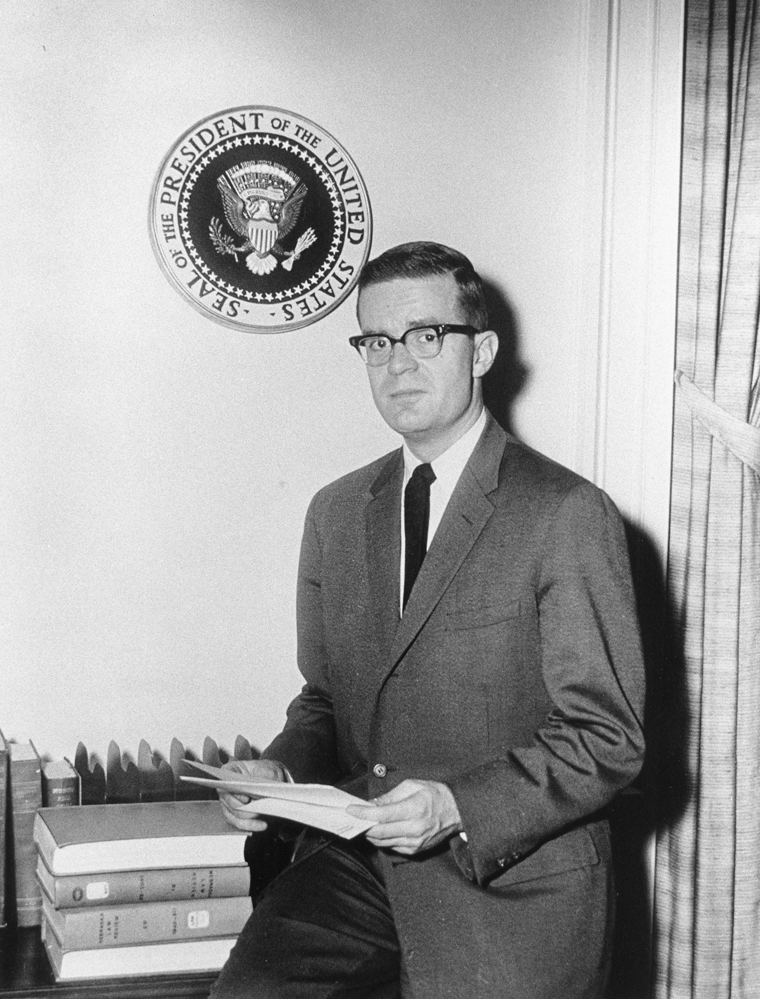
White House photo of Sorensen during the Kennedy administration

Sorensen was President Kennedy's special counsel, adviser, and primary speechwriter, the role for which he is remembered best. He helped draft the inaugural address in which Kennedy said famously, "Ask not what your country can do for you; ask what you can do for your country." Although Sorensen played an important part in the composition of the inaugural address, he has stated that "the speech and its famous turn of phrase that everyone remembers was written by Kennedy himself." In his 2008 memoir, Counselor: A Life at the Edge of History, Sorensen claimed, "The truth is that I simply don't remember where the line came from."

During the early months of the administration, Sorensen's responsibilities concerned the domestic agenda. After the Bay of Pigs debacle, Kennedy asked Sorensen to participate with foreign policy discussions as well. During the Cuban Missile Crisis, Sorensen served as a member of ExComm and was named by Secretary of Defense Robert S. McNamara as one of the "true inner circle" members who advised the president, the others being Attorney General Robert F. Kennedy, National Security Adviser McGeorge Bundy, Secretary of State Dean Rusk, General Maxwell D. Taylor (chairman of the Joint Chiefs), former ambassador to the USSR Llewellyn Thompson, and McNamara himself. Sorensen played a critical role in drafting Kennedy's correspondence with Nikita Khrushchev and worked on Kennedy's first address to the nation about the crisis on October 22.

Sorensen was devastated by Kennedy's assassination, which he termed "the most deeply traumatic experience of my life. ... I had never considered a future without him." He later quoted a poem that he said summed up how he felt: "How could you leave us, how could you die? We are sheep without a shepherd when the snow shuts out the sky." He submitted a letter of resignation to President Lyndon B. Johnson the day after the assassination but was persuaded to stay through the transition. Sorensen drafted Johnson's first address to Congress as well as the 1964 State of the Union. He officially resigned February 29, 1964, and was the first member of the Kennedy Administration to do so. As Johnson was later to recount in his memoirs, Sorensen helped in the transition to the new administration with those speeches.

Prior to his resignation, Sorensen stated his intent to write a biography of Kennedy, calling it "the book that President Kennedy had intended to write with my help after his second term." He was not the only Kennedy aide to publish writings: Paul "Red" Fay Jr., Kennedy's Secretary of the Navy and a close friend of Kennedy's from his Navy service, wrote The Pleasure of His Company; David Powers and Kenneth O'Donnell, Special Assistants to the President, wrote Johnny, We Hardly Knew Ye; and historian and special assistant Arthur M. Schlesinger Jr. wrote his Pulitzer Prize-winning memoir, A Thousand Days: John F. Kennedy in the White House. Sorensen's biography, Kennedy, was published in 1965 and became an international bestseller.

=== Politics after Kennedy ===
Sorensen later joined the U.S. law firm of Paul, Weiss, Rifkind, Wharton & Garrison LLP, where he was of counsel, while still staying involved in politics. He was involved with Democratic campaigns and was a major adviser of Robert F. Kennedy in Kennedy's 1968 presidential campaign. After the death of Robert Kennedy he wrote a book entitled The Kennedy Legacy: A Peaceful Revolution For The Seventies (1969) about the political ideals of the Kennedy brothers that could be applied to the Democratic Party in particular and to America and American society in general going forward. During the next four decades, Sorensen had a career as an international lawyer, advising governments around the world, as well as major international corporations.

During the 1970 United States Senate election in New York, Sorensen was the Democratic party's designee for the Democratic nomination for U.S. senator from New York. He was challenged in the primary election by Richard Ottinger, Paul O'Dwyer, and Max McCarthy, and polled third. The winning nominee Ottinger was subsequently defeated by James L. Buckley in the general election.

In 1973, Sorensen wrote a contingency plan for the presidential transition of the Democratic Speaker of the House Carl Albert. Albert was third in the United States presidential line of succession under the Twenty-fifth Amendment in the event that Richard Nixon was impeached or forced to resign by the Watergate scandal, and if the nomination of Gerald Ford to replace Spiro Agnew as vice president failed. The memorandum included advice on drafting an inaugural address and appointing a Cabinet. It recommended the appointment of a Republican vice president, but urged Albert to remain in office as president until the end of the term. The memorandum was discarded because Ford was nominated and because Albert personally did not wish to be president.

In 1977, President Jimmy Carter nominated Sorensen as Director of Central Intelligence, but the nomination was withdrawn before a Senate vote. Sorensen's help with explaining Ted Kennedy's Chappaquiddick incident and Sorensen's mishandling of classified information were cited as factors of Senate opposition to his nomination. Sorensen in his autobiography attributed the loss of Senate support for his nomination for CIA director to his conscientious objector status as a youth, his two failed marriages, and his writing an affidavit in defense of releasing Daniel Ellsberg's Pentagon Papers.

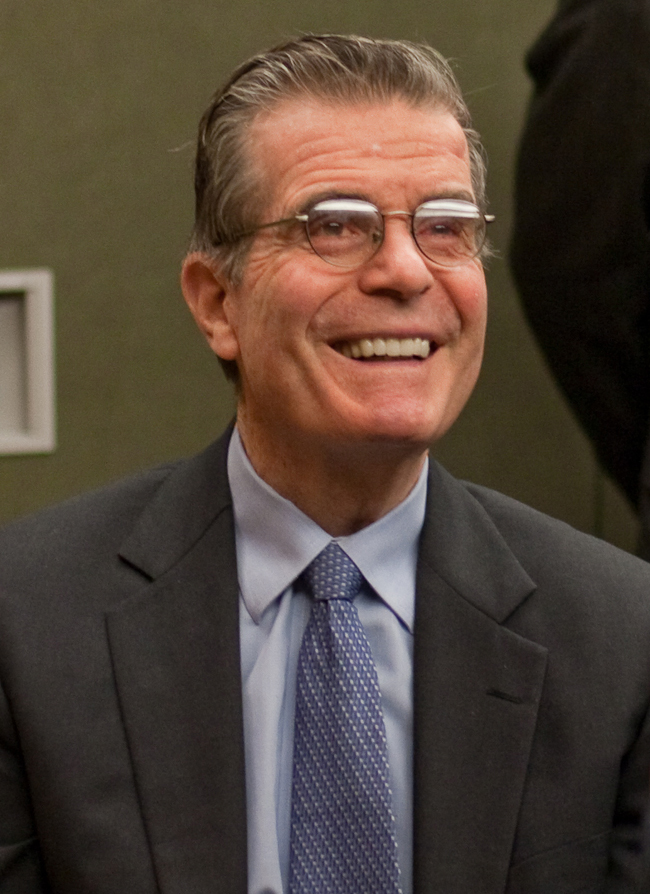
Ted Sorensen in 2009

Sorensen was the national co-chairman for Gary Hart for the 1984 Democratic Party presidential primaries and made several appearances on his behalf.

In addition to his successful career as a lawyer, Sorensen was also a frequent spokesman for liberal ideals and ideas, writing opinion-editorials and delivering speeches concerning domestic and international subjects. For several years during the 1960s, he was an editor of the Saturday Review.

He was affiliated with a number of institutions, including the Council On Foreign Relations, The Century Foundation, Princeton University, and the Institute of Politics at the Harvard Kennedy School. Sorensen was a board member of the International Center for Transitional Justice and an advisory board member of the Partnership for a Secure America, a not-for-profit organization dedicated to recreating bipartisan consensus for American national security and foreign policy. He also was chairman of the advisory board to the International Center for Ethics, Justice and Public Life at Brandeis University. Sorensen also attended meetings of the Judson Welliver Society, a bipartisan social club composed of former presidential speechwriters.

During 2007, a model Democratic presidential nomination acceptance speech written by Sorensen was published in the Washington Monthly. The magazine had solicited him to write the speech that he would most want the 2008 Democratic nominee to give at the 2008 Democratic National Convention, without regard to the identity of the nominee.

On March 9, 2007, he spoke at an event with then-senator Barack Obama at New York City's Grand Hyatt Hotel and officially endorsed him in the presidential election in 2008. Very active in his campaign, Sorensen spoke early on and frequently about the similarities between Obama's and John Kennedy's presidential campaigns. He also provided some assistance with Obama's 2009 inaugural address.

Sorensen served on the advisory board of the National Security Network.

In his book Let The Word Go Forth, Sorensen selects from more than 110 speeches and writings that indicate the importance of historical insights in Kennedy's thoughts and actions.

== Personal life ==
He was married three times. His first marriage, in 1949, was to Camilla Palmer. The couple had three sons: Eric, Steven, and Philip. They later divorced. In 1964, he married Sara Elbery. That marriage also ended in divorce. In 1969, Sorensen married Gillian Martin of the United Nations Foundation. They had a daughter, Juliet Sorensen, and remained married until Sorensen's death.

On February 25, 2010, he received the National Humanities Medal for 2009 in a ceremony in the East Room of the White House. He was awarded the medal for "Advancing our understanding of modern American politics. As a speechwriter and adviser to President Kennedy, he helped craft messages and policies, and later gave us a window into the people and events that made history."

=== Death ===
On October 31, 2010, Sorensen died at the age of 82 at NewYork-Presbyterian Hospital in New York City of complications from a stroke he suffered the previous week.

== Publications ==
External videos
- Booknotes interview with Sorensen on Why I Am a Democrat, July 14, 1996, C-SPAN
- Reception for Sorensen on the publication of Why I Am a Democrat, July 11, 1996, C-SPAN

- Kennedy. Harper & Row. 1965. ISBN 978-1-56852-035-3.
- The Kennedy Legacy: A Peaceful Revolution For The Seventies. London: Weidenfeld & Nicolson. 1969. ISBN 978-0-297-00026-6.
- Watchmen in the Night: Presidential Accountability after Watergate. Cambridge, Mass.: M.I.T. Press. 1976. ISBN 978-0-262-69055-3. (with James MacGregor Burns)
- A Different Kind of Presidency: A Proposal for Breaking the Political Deadlock (1st ed.). New York: Harper & Row. 1984. ISBN 978-0-06-039032-7.
- 'Let the Word Go Forth': The Speeches, Statements, and Writings of John F. Kennedy, 1947–1963 (Reprint ed.). New York: Laurel. 1991. ISBN 978-0-440-50406-1. (Introduction by Sorensen.)
- Why I Am a Democrat (1st ed.). New York: Henry Holt. 1996. ISBN 978-0-8050-4414-0.
- Counselor: A Life at the Edge of History. New York, NY: HarperPerennial. 2009. ISBN 978-0-06-079872-7.

== Portrayals in media ==
Sorensen has been portrayed as a character in the following films and miniseries:

- The 1974 TV film The Missiles of October, by Clifford David
- The 1998 HBO mini-series From the Earth to the Moon, by Jack Gilpin
- The 2000 film Thirteen Days, by Tim Kelleher; although, in an interview after the film's release, Robert McNamara stated that the lead role of Kenneth O'Donnell (played by Kevin Costner) was modeled after Sorensen: "It was not Kenny O'Donnell who pulled us all together—it was Ted Sorensen."
- The 2016 film LBJ, by Brent Bailey
- The 2018 film Chappaquiddick, by Taylor Nichols

== See also ==
- "Ich bin ein Berliner"
- American University speech
- Profiles in Courage (1964 TV series)

Legal offices
Preceded by David Kendall	White House Counsel; 1961–1964	Succeeded by Mike Feldman
