= Sioux City Journal =

Newspaper in Sioux City, Iowa

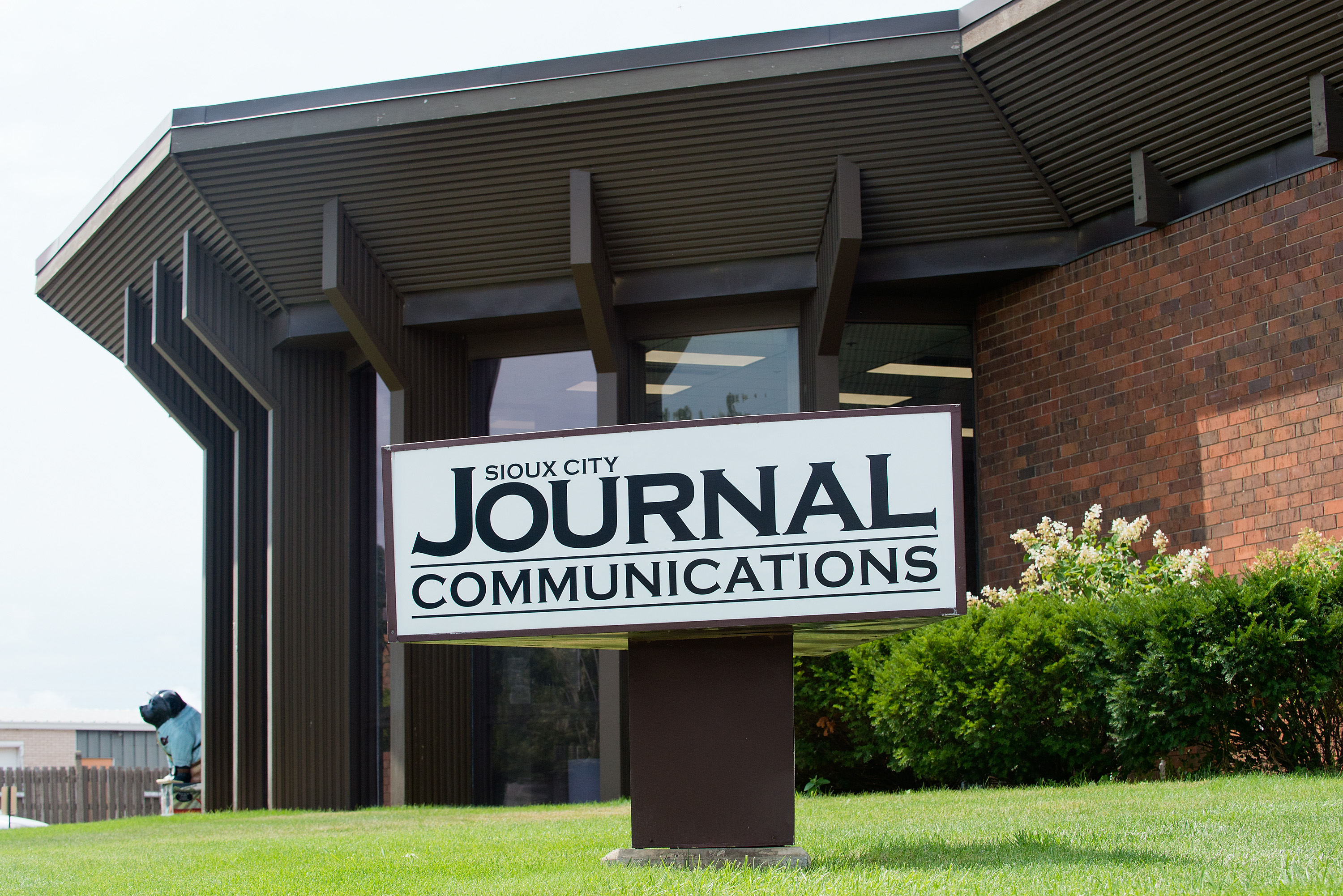
- Side of Sioux City Journal building
- Type: Daily newspaper
- Format: Broadsheet
- Owner: Lee Enterprises
- Publisher: Chad Pauling
- Editor: Bruce R. Miller
- Founded: August 20, 1864
- Headquarters: 2802 Castles Gate Drive, Sioux City, Iowa, US
- Circulation: 10,208 Daily (as of 2023)
- ISSN: 2689-5536 (print); 2689-5544 (web)
- OCLC number: 16755530
- Website: siouxcityjournal.com

The Sioux City Journal is an online newspaper of Sioux City, Iowa and is printed three days a week. Founded in 1864, the publication now covers northwestern Iowa and portions of Nebraska and South Dakota.

The Journal has won numerous state, regional and national awards. It was named one of the "10 that do it right" by the publishing trade journal Editor and Publisher in 2009 and 2013.

The Journal is owned by Lee Enterprises Inc.

== History ==
The Sioux City Journal was founded as a weekly newspaper on August 20, 1864 by Samuel Tait Davis (1828–1900) and others who wanted a strong local voice for the Union Party and the re-election of Abraham Lincoln. Serving as the first editor, Davis continued until after the election, ensuring a pro-Lincoln perspective. With the end of the Union Party after the Civil War, this shifted to a pro-Republican stance.

George and Henry Perkins bought the Sioux City Weekly Journal in 1869, and within a year converted it to a daily newspaper. Continuing the Republican editorial line, George Perkins (1840–1914) served as editor in between terms as a Republican officeholder. Among other offices, he served in the Iowa Senate and the U.S. House of Representatives, and "lost a highly contested bid for Iowa's governorship in 1906."

Noted political cartoonist Jay Norwood Darling, better known as "Ding," worked for the Journal between 1900 and 1906. He later won two Pulitzer Prizes for the Des Moines Register and Leader.

After George Perkins died early in 1914, the paper was left to his son, William R. Perkins, and son-in-law, William Sammons. They hired noted architect William L. Steele to design a new four-story building at the southwest corner of Douglas Street and 5th Street. Housing the paper's editorial, reporting, circulation, advertising sales, and printing operations, the building was ready for occupancy in 1915.

Sammons ran the Journal until his death in 1944. One of his accomplishments was purchasing in 1941 the Journal's primary competitor, the erstwhile pro-Democratic Sioux City Tribune. Since the Journal was a morning paper and the Tribune an evening paper, for over 30 years they continued both papers with a merged staff.

Upon Sammons' death in 1944, William R. Perkins took over publication of the Journal until 1962, and Elizabeth Sammons (daughter of Clara Perkins Sammons) assumed that role in 1962.

By 1972, the elegant building designed by William L. Steele was no longer meeting the paper's needs, and a new plant was built east of downtown at Sixth and Pavonia Streets. The Journal moved there in November of that year, and the Steele building was demolished soon afterwards.

On December 14, 1972, the Journal-Tribune Publishing Co. was purchased by Hagadone Corp. of Coeur d'Alene, Idaho, and Howard Publications of Oceanside, California. Shortly after the ownership change, the Journal dropped its afternoon editions and became a seven-day morning paper. Lee Enterprises Inc. of Davenport, Iowa, bought Howard Publications in February 2002, giving it half-ownership of the paper; in June 2002, Lee purchased the remaining half from Hagadone.

The newspaper founded radio station KSCJ in 1927 and co-founded television station KTIV in 1953. Both have been sold off.

On June 20, 2023, the print edition of the newspaper went to three days a week: Tuesday, Thursday and Saturday. Also, the newspaper transitioned from being delivered by a traditional newspaper delivery carrier to mail delivery by the U.S. Postal Service.

== See also ==
- George D. Perkins
- Sioux City Tribune
