= Speechwriter =

Writer of speeches to be delivered by another person

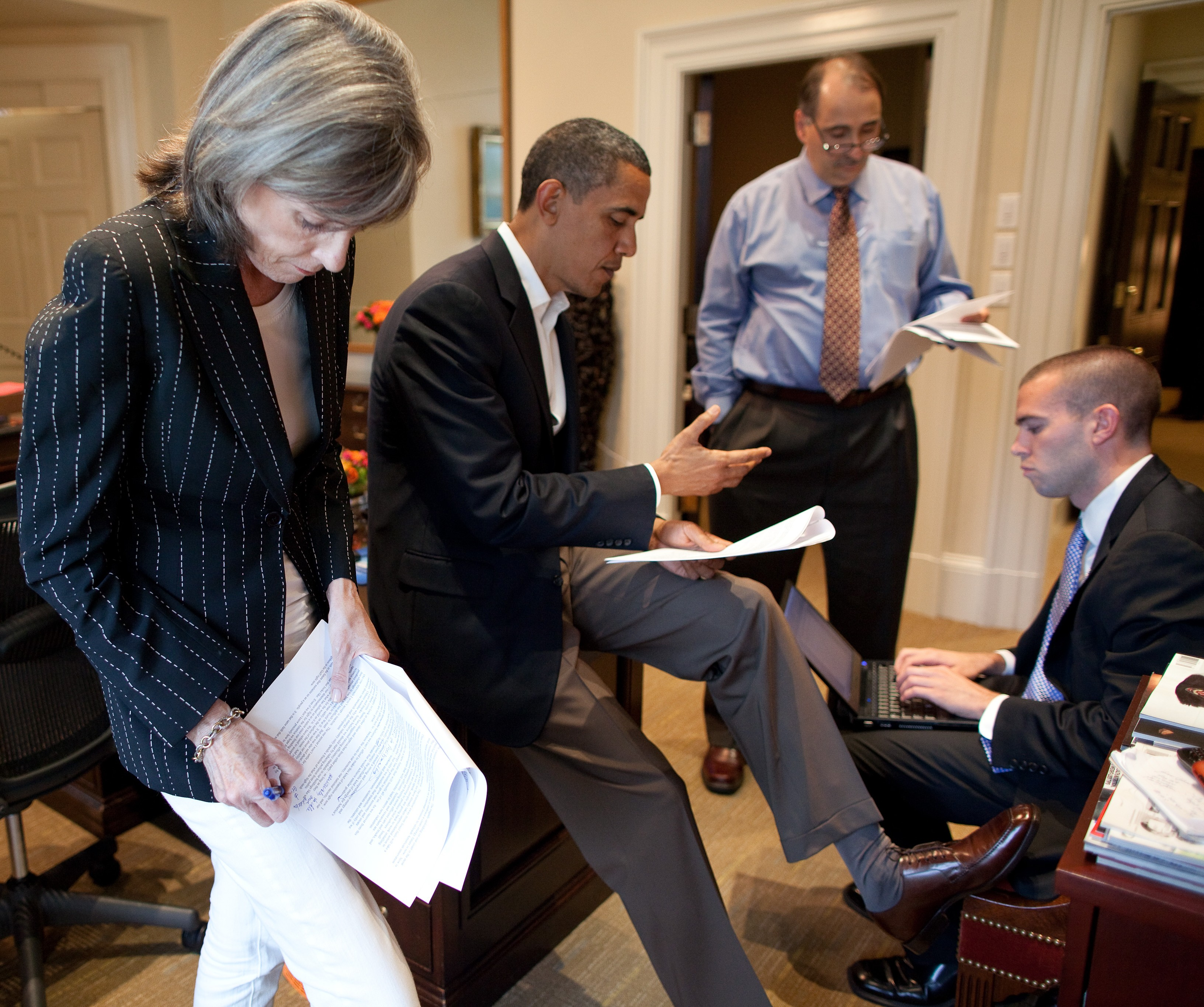
U.S. President Barack Obama and aides Carol Browner, David Axelrod, and Jon Favreau working on a speech in June 2010

A speechwriter is a person who writes speeches to be delivered by another person. Speechwriters commonly write for governments. They can also be employed to write for special occasions.

== Skills and training ==
A speechwriter typically works at the highest levels of government or businesses and directly with political leaders or executives to determine the points, themes, positions, or messages that should be included in a speech, and usually to author the speech itself. Speechwriters need to be able to accept criticism and comments on the different drafts of the speech, and be able to incorporate the proposed changes into the draft. Speechwriters have to be able to work on several different speeches at once, and manage their time so that they can meet demanding deadlines for finishing the speech on time. Speechwriters must also be able to accept anonymity, because with few exceptions, speechwriters are not officially credited or acknowledged. This aspect creates a dilemma for historians and compilers of speech anthology; namely, when some significant phrase gains popularity such as John F. Kennedy's "ask not what your country can do for you, ask what you can do for your country," whether credit be given to Kennedy, to speechwriter Ted Sorensen, or to both?

While there is a guild called "The UK Speechwriters' Guild" for professional speechwriters, they often do not have specific training in the area or field for which they are writing speeches. Instead, speechwriters often have a broad understanding of basic economics, political roles, and policy issues, which make them generalists who are able to "translate" complex economic and policy issues into a clear message for the general public. As with many other writing occupations, most speechwriters do not have specific training in their writing craft. Instead, speechwriters often develop their speech writing skills by combining a general liberal arts education, such as political science, philosophy, or English literature, with a variety of work experience in politics, public administration, journalism, or a related field.

== Speechwriting process ==
Writing a speech involves several steps. A speechwriter often meets with the executive and the executive's senior staff to determine the broad framework of points or messages that the executive wants to cover in the speech. Usually, speechwriters conduct additional research flesh out this framework with anecdotes and examples. The speechwriter will also consider the audience for the speech, which can range from a town-hall meeting of community leaders to an international leaders' forum. Then the speechwriter blends the points, themes, positions, and messages with their own research to create an "informative, original and authentic speech" for the executive.

The speechwriter then presents a draft version of the speech to the executive (or the executive's staff) and makes notes on any revisions or changes that are requested. If the speechwriter is familiar with the topic and the positions and style of the executive, only small changes may be needed. In other cases, the executive may feel that the speech does not have the right tone or flow, and the entire speech may have to be re-drafted. Professional speechwriter Lawrence Bernstein writes:

Some clients have called with six months to spare, others with four hours to go; some want to meet up first, others want coaching afterwards; quite a few did everything by email and we've never even spoken.

The delivery of the speech is part of the challenge speechwriters face when crafting the message. Executive speechwriter Anthony Trendl writes:

Speechwriters specialize in a kind of writing that merges marketing, theater, public relations, sales, education and politics all in one presentation.

== Notable speechwriters ==
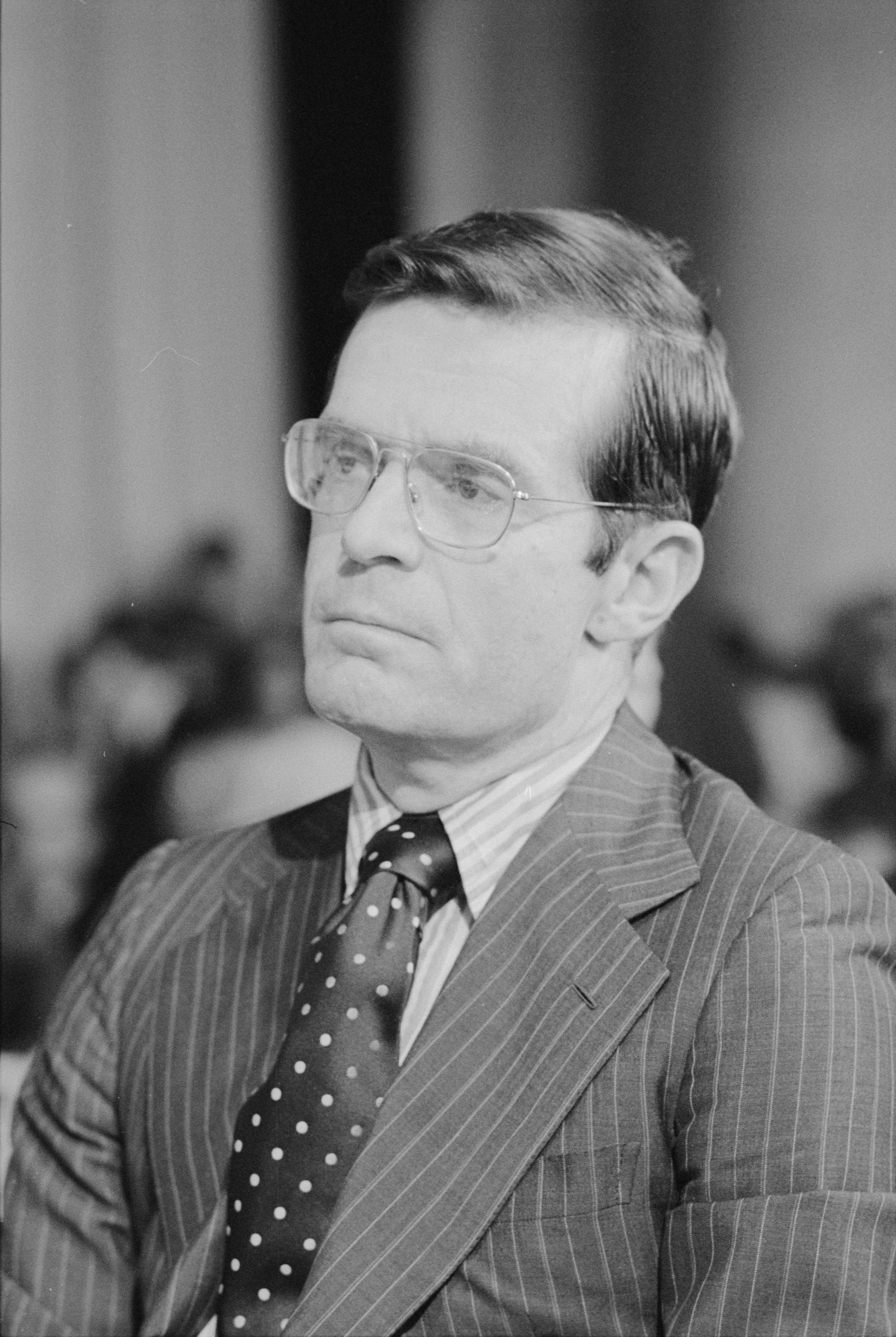
Ted Sorensen authored President John F. Kennedy's Inaugural Address in January 1961, which included the famed phrase, "Ask not what your country can do for you, ask what you can do for your country."

Some of the world's most notable political speechwriters include:

=== Australia ===
- Don Watson wrote for Prime Minister Paul Keating

=== Chile ===
- Jaime Guzmán wrote for Chilean military dictator Augusto Pinochet

=== Europe ===
- Henri Guaino wrote for French President Nicolas Sarkozy
- Sir Ronald Millar wrote for British Prime Minister Margaret Thatcher

=== Nigeria ===
- Reuben Abati wrote for President Goodluck Jonathan
- Olusegun Adeniyi wrote for President Umaru Musa Yar'Adua
- Farooq Kperogi wrote for President Olusegun Obasanjo

=== Soviet Union and Russia ===
- Aleksandr Bovin wrote for General Secretary Leonid Brezhnev
- Abbas Gallyamov wrote for Prime Minister Vladimir Putin
- Jahan Polliyeva wrote for Presidents Boris Yeltsin, Vladimir Putin and Dmitry Medvedev
- Alexey Pushkov wrote for General Secretary Mikhail Gorbachev
- Alexander Yakovlev wrote for General Secretary Mikhail Gorbachev
- Tatyana Yumasheva wrote for President Boris Yeltsin
- Valentin Yumashev wrote for President Boris Yeltsin

=== United States ===
- Michael Anton wrote for President Donald Trump
- Aram Bakshian wrote for Presidents Richard Nixon and Gerald Ford
- Samuel Beer wrote for President Franklin D. Roosevelt
- Josef Berger wrote for Presidents Harry S. Truman and Lyndon B. Johnson
- Pat Buchanan wrote for President Richard Nixon
- Christopher Buckley wrote for President George H. W. Bush
- Andrei Cherny wrote for President Bill Clinton
- William Dodd wrote for President Woodrow Wilson
- Anthony R. Dolan wrote for President Ronald Reagan
- Ben T. Elliott wrote for President Ronald Reagan
- George Elsey wrote for President Harry Truman
- William B. Ewald Jr. wrote for President Dwight Eisenhower
- James Fallows wrote for President Jimmy Carter
- Jon Favreau wrote for President Barack Obama
- Andrew Ferguson wrote for President George H. W. Bush
- Charlie Fern wrote for President George W. Bush and for First Lady Laura Bush
- David Frum wrote for President George W. Bush
- Adam Garfinkle wrote for President George W. Bush
- David Gergen wrote for President Richard Nixon
- Michael Gerson wrote for President George W. Bush
- George Gilder wrote for President Richard Nixon
- Richard N. Goodwin wrote for presidents John F. Kennedy and Lyndon B. Johnson
- Josh Gottheimer wrote for President Bill Clinton
- Alexander Hamilton wrote for President George Washington
- Bob Hardesty wrote for President Lyndon B. Johnson
- Jeffrey Hart wrote for President Richard Nixon
- Robert T. Hartmann wrote for President Gerald Ford
- Ken Hechler wrote for President Harry Truman
- Hendrik Hertzberg wrote for President Jimmy Carter
- Emmet John Hughes wrote for President Dwight D. Eisenhower
- David Humphreys wrote for President George Washington
- Sarah Hurwitz wrote for President Barack Obama
- Michael Johns wrote for President George H. W. Bush
- Hugh S. Johnson wrote for President Franklin D. Roosevelt
- Mark Katz wrote for President Bill Clinton
- Ken Khachigian wrote for Presidents Richard Nixon and Ronald Reagan
- Arthur Larson wrote for President Dwight Eisenhower
- Matt Latimer wrote for President George W. Bush
- Henry Lee IV wrote for President Andrew Jackson
- David Litt wrote for President Barack Obama
- Jon Lovett wrote for President Barack Obama
- Chris Matthews wrote for President Jimmy Carter
- William McGurn wrote for President George W. Bush
- John McLaughlin wrote for President Richard Nixon
- Harry J. Middleton wrote for President Lyndon B. Johnson
- Stephen Miller wrote for President Donald Trump
- Raymond Moley wrote for President Franklin D. Roosevelt
- Malcolm Moos wrote for President Dwight Eisenhower
- Peggy Noonan wrote for presidents Ronald Reagan and George H. W. Bush
- Jay Nordlinger wrote for President George W. Bush
- Robert Orben wrote for President Gerald Ford
- Mark Palmer wrote for President Ronald Reagan
- Landon Parvin wrote for Presidents Ronald Reagan, George H. W. Bush and George W. Bush
- John Podhoretz wrote for Presidents Ronald Reagan and George H. W. Bush
- Ray Price wrote for Presidents Richard Nixon and Gerald Ford
- Aneesh Raman wrote for President Barack Obama
- Katherine Reback wrote for President Bill Clinton
- Peter Robinson wrote for Presidents Ronald Reagan and George H. W. Bush
- Samuel Rosenman wrote for Presidents Franklin D. Roosevelt and Harry S. Truman
- William Safire wrote for President Richard Nixon
- Arthur M. Schlesinger Jr. wrote for President John F. Kennedy
- Matthew Scully wrote for President George W. Bush
- Walter Shapiro wrote for President Jimmy Carter
- Michael A. Sheehan wrote for President Bill Clinton
- Robert E. Sherwood wrote for President Franklin D. Roosevelt
- Jeff Shesol wrote for President Bill Clinton
- David Shipley wrote for President Bill Clinton
- Raymond Siller wrote for presidents Richard Nixon, Ronald Reagan, George H. W. Bush, and George W. Bush
- Curt Smith wrote for President George H. W. Bush
- Tony Snow wrote for President George H. W. Bush
- Ted Sorensen wrote for President John F. Kennedy
- Ben Stein wrote for President Richard Nixon
- Marc Thiessen wrote for President George W. Bush
- Michael Waldman wrote for President Bill Clinton
- Orson Welles wrote for President Franklin D. Roosevelt
- Judson T. Welliver, considered the first official presidential speechwriter in the modern sense of the occupation, wrote for President Warren G. Harding and Calvin Coolidge
- Mari Maseng Will wrote for President Ronald Reagan

== Fictional speechwriters ==
Some fictional speechwriters include:

- James Hobert (played by Alexander Chaplin), speechwriter for the fictional Mayor of New York City Randall Winston on Spin City
- Toby Ziegler (played by Richard Schiff), Sam Seaborn (played by Rob Lowe), and Will Bailey (played by Joshua Malina), all of whom were speechwriters for the Bartlet administration on The West Wing
