= Robert McNamara as Secretary of Defense =

American Secretary of Defense (1961–1968)

Robert McNamara
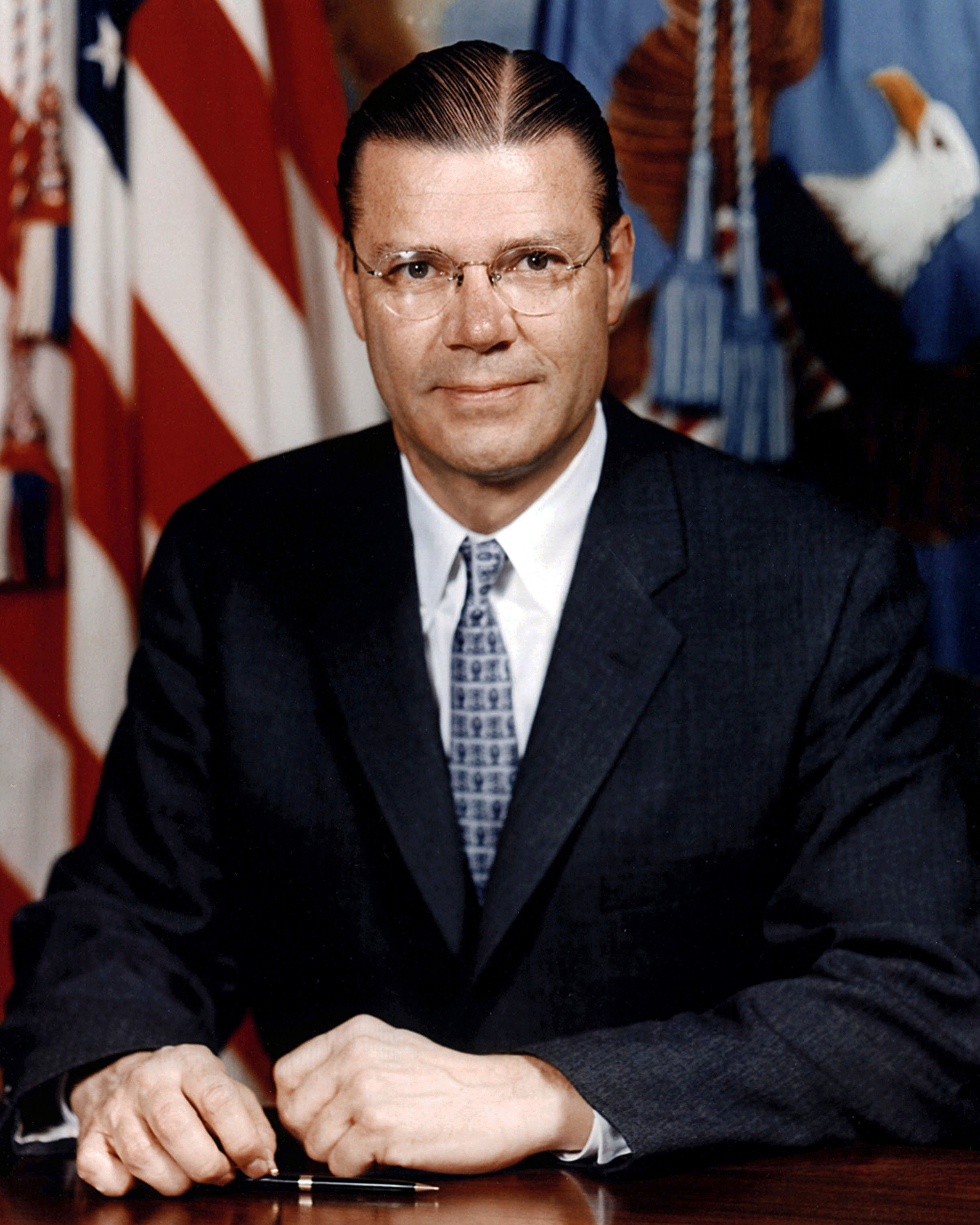
- Official portrait, 1961

8th United States Secretary of Defense
- In office January 21, 1961 – February 29, 1968
- President: John F. Kennedy; Lyndon B. Johnson
- Deputy: Roswell Gilpatric; Cyrus Vance; Paul Nitze
- Preceded by: Thomas S. Gates Jr.
- Succeeded by: Clark Clifford

Robert McNamara served as the eighth United States secretary of defense from 1961 to 1968 under Presidents John F. Kennedy and Lyndon B. Johnson at the height of the Cold War. He remains the longest-serving secretary of defense, having remained in office over seven years. He played a major role in promoting the U.S. involvement in the Vietnam War. McNamara was responsible for the institution of systems analysis in public policy, which developed into the discipline known today as policy analysis.

Many of his views on the military, including negative views, were formed during his U.S. Army Air Force service in World War II under General Curtis LeMay.

== Nomination ==
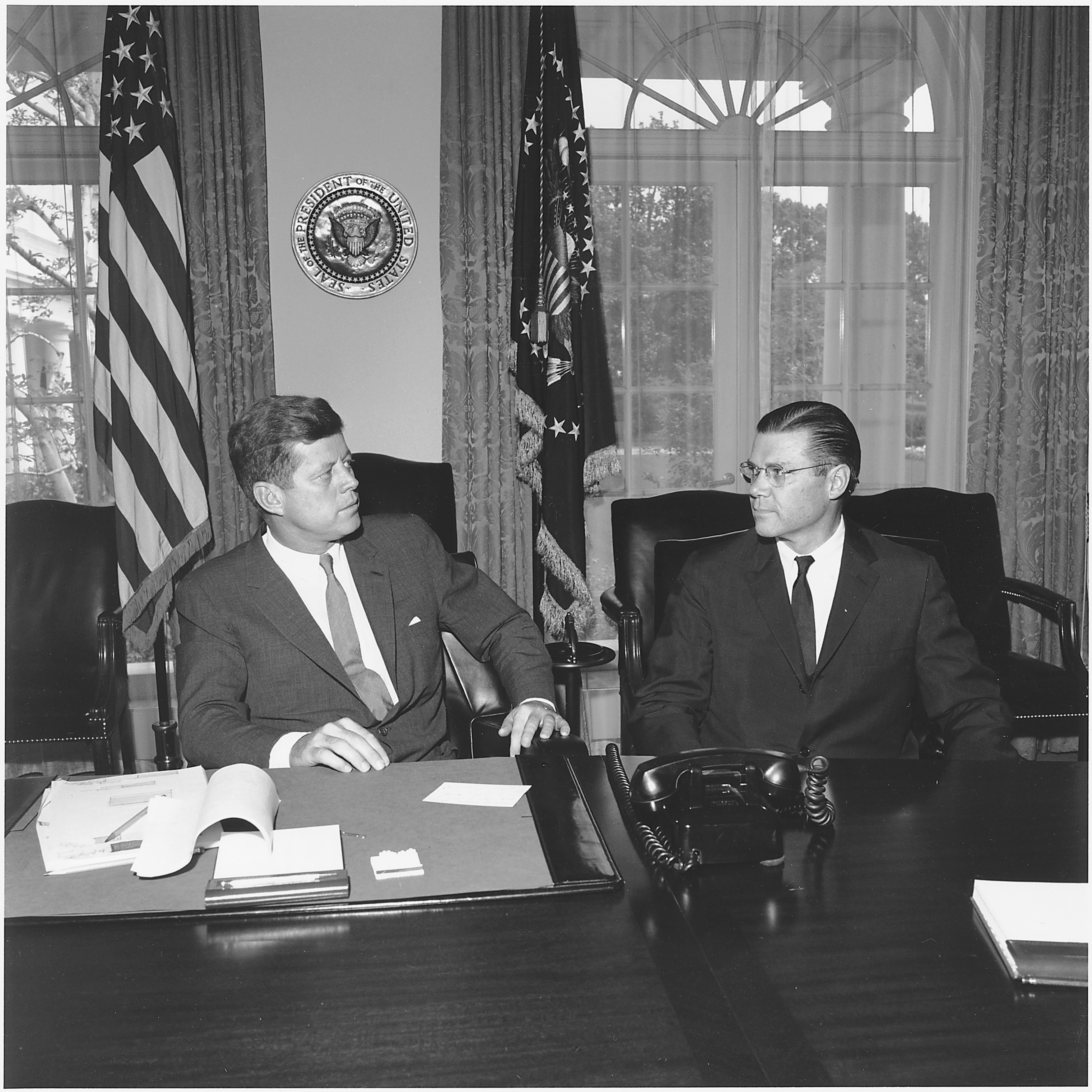
President John F. Kennedy and McNamara, 1962

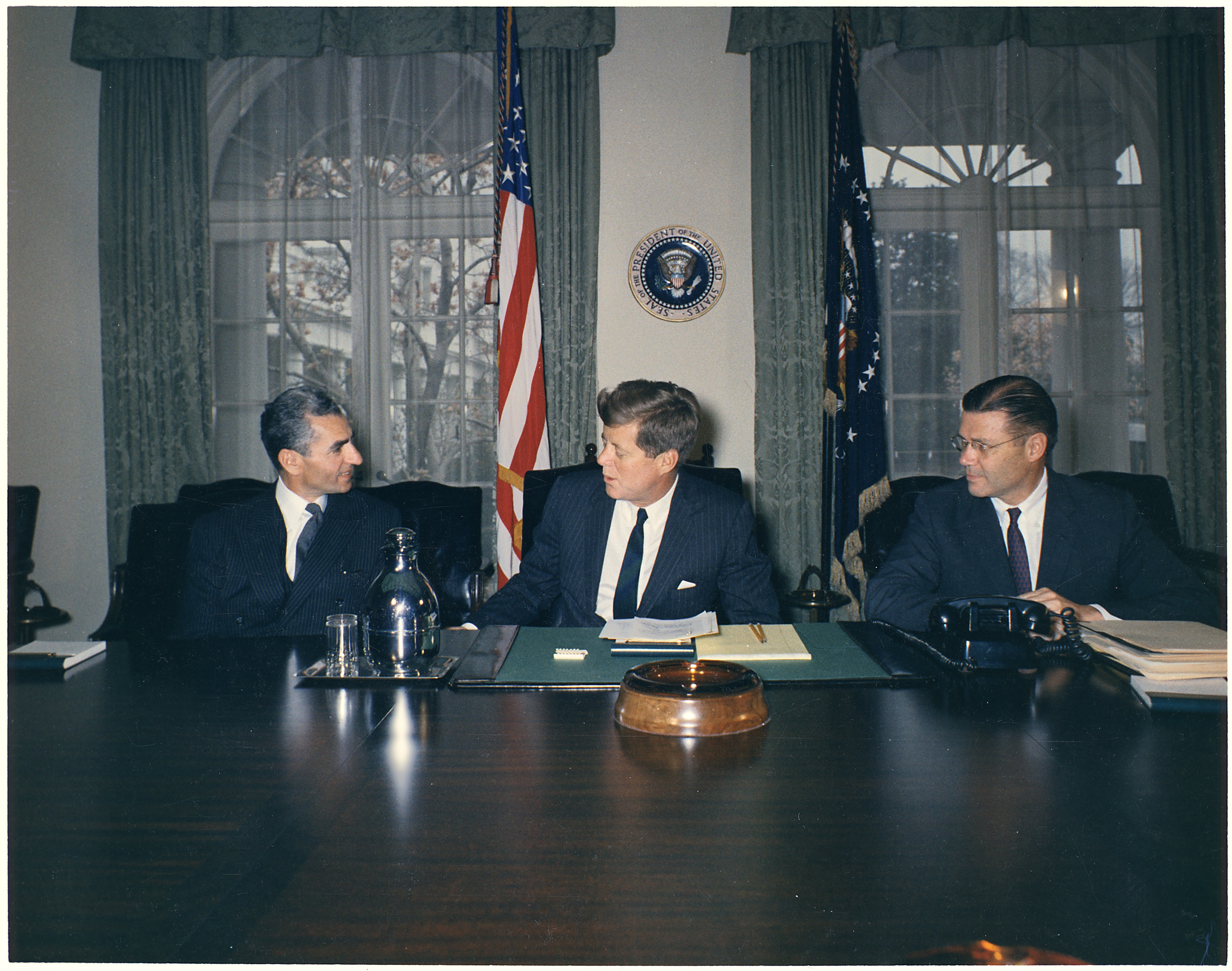
Kennedy and McNamara with Iran's Shah Mohammad Reza Pahlavi in April 1962

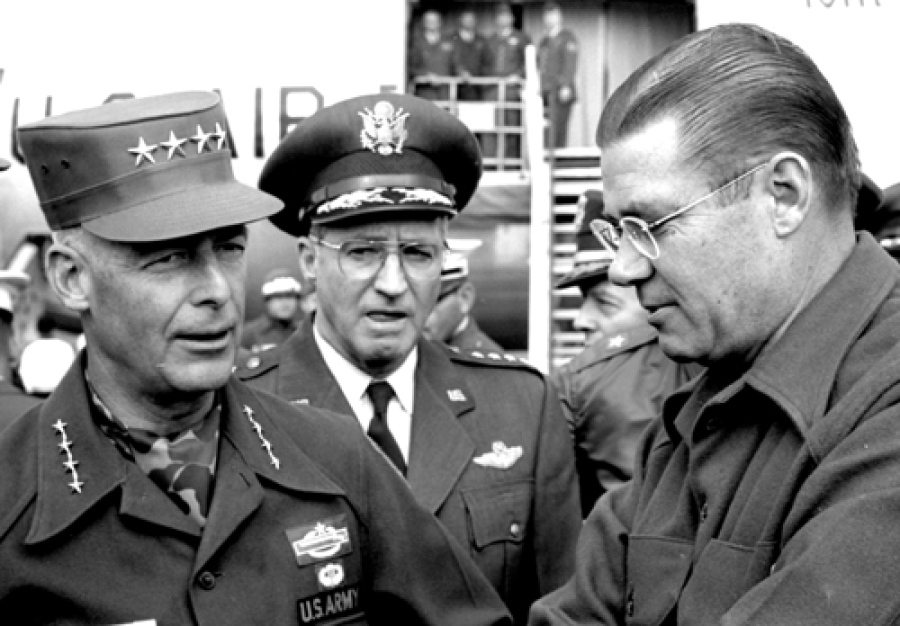
U.S. Secretary of Defense Robert McNamara accompanied by U.S. Air Force Chief of Staff General John P. McConnell greeted by Commanding General, United States Army Europe General Paul L. Freeman Jr. during a visit to Rhein-Main Air Force Base in Frankfurt, Germany, September 7, 1962

After his election in 1960, President-elect John F. Kennedy first offered the post of Secretary of Defense to Robert A. Lovett, who had already served in that position in the Truman administration; Lovett declined but recommended McNamara. Kennedy had read about McNamara and his career at Ford Motor Company in a Time magazine article on 2 December 1960, and interviewed him on 8 December, with his brother and right-hand man Robert F. Kennedy also present. McNamara told Kennedy that he didn't know anything about government, to which Kennedy replied: "We can learn our jobs together. I don't know how to be president either". McNamara had read Kennedy's ghostwritten Pulitzer Prize winning book Profiles in Courage and asked him if he had really written it himself, with Kennedy insisting that he did. McNamara's confidence and self-assurance impressed Kennedy. Kennedy offered McNamara the chance to be either Secretary of Defense or Secretary of the Treasury; McNamara came back a week later, accepting the post of Secretary of Defense on the condition of having the right of final approval in all appointments to the Department of Defense (DoD), with Kennedy replying: "It's a deal". (Note: One exception to McNamara's control of DoD appointments would be Kennedy's choice of his longtime friend and WW2 compatriot Paul B. Fay as Undersecretary of the Navy.) McNamara's salary as the CEO of Ford was $3 million per year while by contrast the position of the Defense Secretary paid only $25,000 per year. Given the financial sacrifices, McNamara was able to insist to Kennedy that he have the right to appoint his officials and run the Pentagon his own way.

McNamara became one of the few members of the Kennedy Administration to socialize with Kennedy, and he became close to Attorney General Robert F. Kennedy, eventually serving as a pallbearer at the younger Kennedy's funeral in 1968.

According to Special Counsel Ted Sorensen, Kennedy regarded McNamara as the "star of his team, calling upon him for advice on a wide range of issues beyond national security, including business and economic matters." Vice president Lyndon B. Johnson was similarly impressed with McNamara and the other Kennedy appointees, but his mentor House Speaker Sam Rayburn replied “Well, Lyndon, you may be right and they may be every bit as intelligent as you say, but I’d feel a whole lot better about them if just one of them had run for sheriff once,” a comment on the importance of respect for democratic norms.

McNamara's powers of retention were impressive: at a 23 July 1962 Honolulu meeting on the Vietnam War buildup he suddenly said “Stop—slide 319 does not agree with slide 5” and was proved correct upon retrieval of slide 5. (Note: See The Best and the Brightest § Errata for a different account of this slide presentation.) McNamara insisted that all DoD briefers submit written reports “[b]ecause I can read faster than they can talk.”

Initially, the basic policies outlined by President Kennedy in a message to Congress on 28 March 1961, guided McNamara in the reorientation of the defense program. Kennedy rejected the concept of first-strike attack and emphasized the need for adequate strategic arms and defense to deter nuclear attack on the United States and its allies. U.S. arms, he maintained, must constantly be under civilian command and control, and the nation's defense posture had to be "designed to reduce the danger of irrational or unpremeditated general war." The primary mission of U.S. overseas forces, in cooperation with its allies, was "to prevent the steady erosion of the Free World through limited wars". Kennedy and McNamara rejected massive retaliation for a posture of flexible response. The U.S. wanted choices in an emergency other than "inglorious retreat or unlimited retaliation", as the president put it. Out of a major review of the military challenges confronting the U.S. initiated by McNamara in 1961 came a decision to increase the nation's "limited warfare" capabilities. These moves were significant because McNamara was abandoning President Dwight D. Eisenhower's policy of massive retaliation in favor of a flexible response strategy that relied on increased U.S. capacity to conduct limited, non-nuclear warfare.

== Development of military capabilities ==
=== Nuclear strategy ===
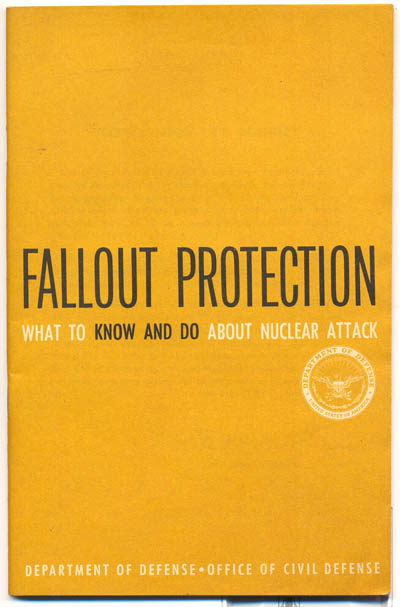
United States Civil Defense booklet Fallout Protection, commissioned by McNamara

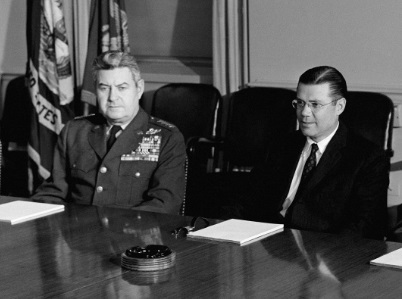
U.S. Secretary of Defense Robert McNamara with U.S. Air Force Chief of Staff General Curtis LeMay at The Pentagon on April 10, 1963 (the day of the loss of the USS Thresher). During World War II, McNamara served under LeMay's command as a statistician for the United States Army Air Forces.

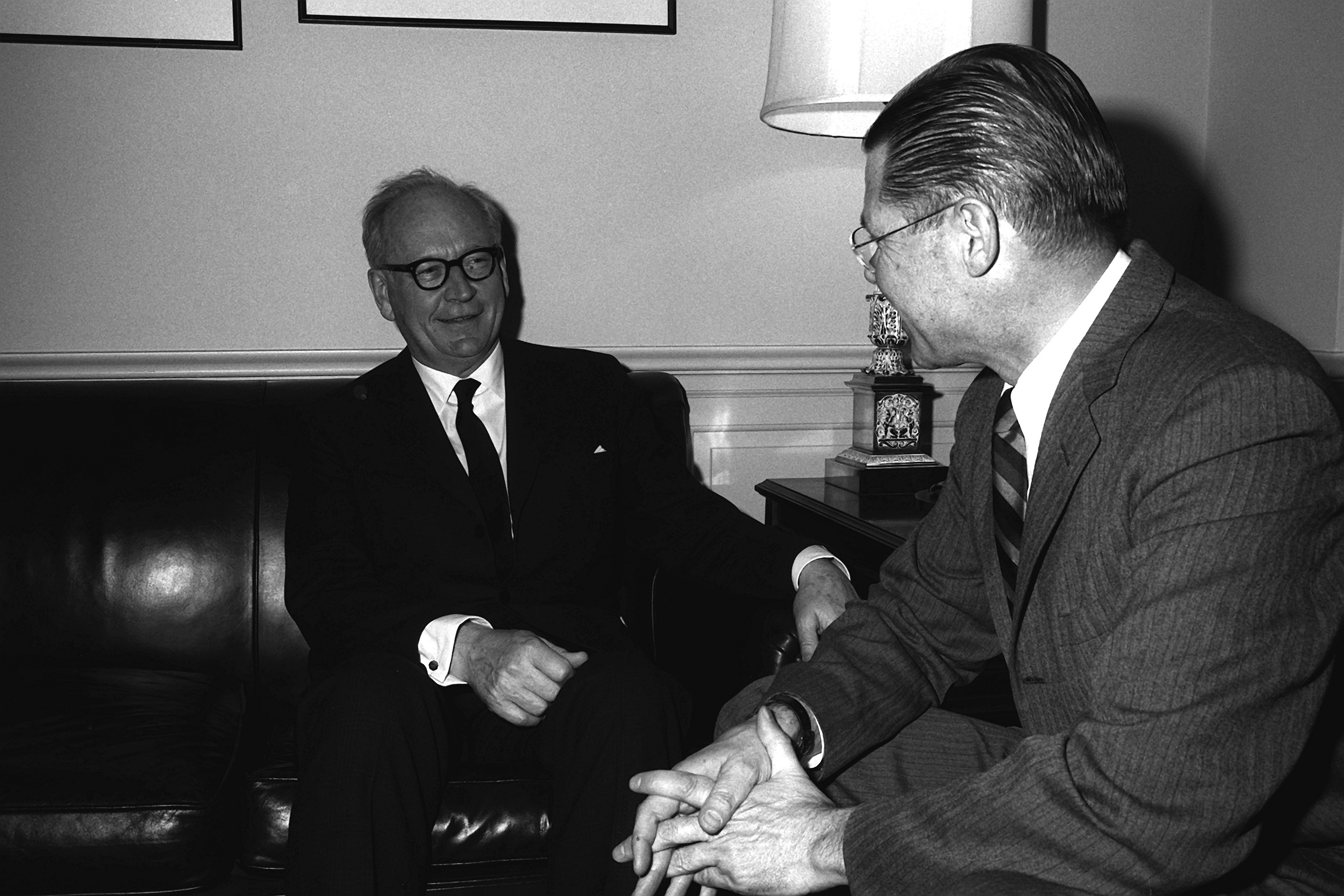
NATO Military Committee chairman General Adolf Heusinger meeting with McNamara at the Pentagon, 1964

When McNamara took over the Pentagon in 1961, the United States military relied on an all-out nuclear strike to respond to a Soviet attack of any kind, which would kill Soviet military forces and civilians. This was the same nuclear strategy planned by the Strategic Air Command (SAC), formerly led by General Curtis LeMay (LeMay was Air Force Vice Chief of Staff in early 1961, and became Chief of Staff on 30 June 1961). McNamara did not initially agree with this approach. He sought other options after seeing that this strategy could not guarantee the destruction of all Soviet nuclear weapons, thus leaving the United States vulnerable to retaliation. He educated NATO members on the Cold War doctrine of deterrence. (Note: David Halberstam wrote “McNamara worked hard to change Western thinking about nuclear policy. He set out to educate not just the Pentagon but his European colleagues as well, forming the Nuclear Planning Group for his European counterparts, men who were politicians first, not managers, and thus felt themselves particularly dependent on their generals...gradually he forced them to take political responsibility for defense positions...”) McNamara's alternative in the doctrine of counterforce was to try to limit the United States nuclear exchange by targeting only enemy military forces. This would hopefully prevent retaliation and escalation by holding Soviet cities hostage to a follow-up strike. McNamara later concluded that counterforce was not likely to control escalation but to provoke retaliation. The U.S. nuclear policy remained the same.

==== Triad doctrine ====
Regarding strategic nuclear weapons delivery systems, McNamara continued development of the nuclear triad, a three-pronged military force structure of land-based intercontinental ballistic missiles (ICBMs), sea-based submarine-launched ballistic missiles (SLBMs), and airborne strategic bombers with short range attack missiles (SRAMs); this structure was considered necessary to ensure the survival of enough weapons for deterrence.

McNamara would accelerate the retirement of obsolete or marginally useful strategic systems. (Note: These obsolete or marginally useful strategic systems would include the Boeing B-47 Stratojet bomber, the CGM/HGM-16 Atlas and HGM-25A Titan I ballistic missiles, and the SM-62 Snark and RGM-6 Regulus cruise missiles.)

The Department of Defense began the STRAT-X study on 1 November 1966 to evaluate a new ballistic missile proposal from the Air Force. The first result, the heavy BGM-75 AICBM, would be canceled by McNamara in 1967 on the grounds that it would be destabilizing; the study would later lead to several more advanced missile systems after McNamara left office. (Note: These post-McNamara missiles resulting from the STRAT-X study would include the UGM-96 Trident I, LGM-118 Peacekeeper, UGM-133 Trident II, and MGM-134 Midgetman.)

==== Skybolt Crisis ====
Prior to the decision to develop SRAMs, the U.S. and the United Kingdom had agreed during the Eisenhower administration to jointly develop the AGM-48 Skybolt air-launched ballistic missile (ALBM), with the British canceling all of their missile programs. McNamara announced plans to cancel the program in November 1962, following unsuccessful tests of Skybolt and successful tests of the Polaris and Minuteman missiles, though early Polaris and Minuteman test failure rates had been comparable to Skybolt. He persuaded President Kennedy to cancel the program on 23 November 1962. This triggered the diplomatic Skybolt Crisis with the UK; Kennedy quickly convened a conference with Prime Minister Harold Macmillan in mid-December 1962. The result was the Nassau Agreement, under which the U.S. would supply the Royal Navy with Polaris missiles for UK manufactured nuclear warheads and submarines (a step McNamara had opposed).

==== Heightened alert ====
McNamara raised the proportion of Strategic Air Command (SAC) strategic bombers on 15-minute ground alert from 25% to 50%, thus lessening their vulnerability to missile attack. He also approved Operation Chrome Dome in 1961, in which some B-52 strategic bomber aircraft armed with thermonuclear weapons remained on continuous airborne alert, flying routes that put them in positions to attack targets in the Soviet Union if they were ordered to do so. This would lead to a number of Broken Arrow nuclear weapon accidents. (Note: The U.S. strategic bomber airborne alert operation, code-named Chrome Dome, was also seen as a realistic training mission.)

==== Command and control ====
McNamara was concerned that unauthorized use of nuclear weapons was possible. He advocated the development of what became known as Permissive Action Links (PALs), devices incorporated into nuclear weapons that would render them inoperable during an unauthorized attempted use. The PALs were first installed on weapons stored in Europe, and then throughout the U.S. inventory.

In an October 1961 memo, McNamara was quoted as expressing concern over command and control and proliferation of the infantry crewed Davy Crockett nuclear recoilless rifle.

==== Nuclear testing ====
Prior to the end of the 1958–1961 nuclear test moratorium, McNamara privately acknowledged that atmospheric tests were "not really necessary." Once President Kennedy decided to resume atmospheric and exoatmospheric testing, the Department of Defense gave materiel support to the 1962 Operation Dominic, Operation Fishbowl and Operation Sunbeam test series. After the Partial Nuclear Test Ban Treaty had been signed, McNamara in August 1963 announced his "unequivocal support" for the treaty ratification before the Senate Foreign Relations Committee, arguing that U.S. nuclear forces were secure and clearly superior to those of the Soviet Union, and that any major Soviet tests would be detected.

==== Anti-ballistic missile system ====
Toward the end of his term, McNamara opposed an anti-ballistic missile (ABM) system proposed for installation in the U.S. in defense against Soviet missiles, arguing that the $40 billion "in itself is not the problem; the penetrability of the proposed shield is the problem." (Note: Missiles developed for missile defense under McNamara included the LIM-49 Nike Zeus (canceled in 1963), LIM-49 Spartan, and Sprint.) Under pressure to proceed with the ABM program after it became clear that the Soviets had begun a similar project, McNamara finally agreed to a "light" system which he believed could protect against the far smaller number of Chinese missiles. (Note: This "light" ABM system would be installed at the Stanley R. Mickelsen Safeguard Complex after McNamara left office.) However, he never believed it was wise for the United States to move in that direction because of the psychological risks of relying too much on nuclear weaponry, and that there would be pressure from many directions to build a larger system than would be militarily effective.

McNamara always believed that the best defense strategy for the U.S. was a parity of mutual assured destruction with the Soviet Union. An ABM system would be an ineffective weapon as compared to an increase in deployed nuclear missile capacity.

==== Tactical weapons ====
Under McNamara the U.S. military continued to accept the upgrading of existing tactical nuclear weapons with new warheads, while new weapon delivery systems were uncommon. Development and initial deployment of the MGM-31 Pershing theater ballistic missile was completed under McNamara, which allowed for the retirement of several competitors. (Note: The Pershing missile would lead in part to the retirement of the PGM-11 Redstone, PGM-17 Thor, and PGM-19 Jupiter ballistic missiles, and the MGM-1 Matador and MGM-13 Mace cruise missiles.) Also developed and/or deployed at this time were the MGM-29 Sergeant and MGM-52 Lance short-range ballistic missiles (SRBMs) and the innovative UUM-44 SUBROC anti-submarine missile.

=== Chemical and biological warfare ===
==== Project 112 ====
Project 112, a biological and chemical weapon experimentation project, was authorized by Robert McNamara as part of a total review of the U.S. military. The name "Project 112" refers to this project's number in the 150 project review process authorized by McNamara. Funding and staff were contributed by every branch of the U.S. armed services and intelligence agencies. Project 112 primarily concerned the use of aerosols to disseminate biological and chemical agents that could produce "controlled temporary incapacitation". The test program was conducted on a large scale at "extracontinental test sites" in the Central and South Pacific with some exposure to military personnel, and secretly in civilian locations such as the New York subway with bacteria deemed 'harmless' but without consent.

==== Defoliants ====
South Vietnamese president Ngô Đình Diệm on 29 September 1961 met with Frederick Nolting, the American ambassador, and Lieutenant General Lionel C. McGarr, the commander of the U.S. Military Assistance Advisory Group (MAAG); Diệm demanded that herbicides be used to eliminate the Viet Cong’s food supply. On 6 November 1961, Nolting and McGarr asked McNamara to initiate some “defoliation and food killing projects,” but they received no immediate answer. In turn President Kennedy approved a test run of sixteen miles of defoliant road spraying in January 1962; the Joint Chiefs of Staff and the State Department opposed the test out of fear of a propaganda backlash.

In 1962, McNamara supported a plan for spraying of rice fields with herbicides in the mountains of Phu Yen province to starve the Viet Cong out, but this was stopped when Assistant Secretary of State for Far Eastern Affairs W. Averell Harriman pointed out that this would harm innocent people. McNamara continued to push for the program, reminding Kennedy that crops are destroyed in every war. If herbicides were forbidden, the South Vietnamese would still do the job, either by hand or with napalm. Herbicides were simply more efficient, killing more of the enemy's food with less effort. The program eventually went ahead.

On 17 April 1963, McNamara was advised, “The crop destruction operation is estimated to have resulted in the destruction of over 700,000 pounds of rice, or roughly enough to feed 1,000 Viet Cong for one year. Militarily and technically, the results were excellent.”

McNamara would later claim to have no recollection of approving any use of defoliants, though he acknowledged the Department of Defense did under his tenure.

=== Militarization of space ===
Initially McNamara expressed ambivalence over Defense Department plans to conduct manned military operations in space. He would reverse himself by claiming the Air Force "did not have any real objectives for orbital flight" and canceling the Boeing X-20 Dyna-Soar reusable space plane in December 1964. McNamara allowed the Manned Orbiting Laboratory reconnaissance project to go forward, but he consistently underfunded the project, and it would be canceled after he left office. The development of anti-satellite weapons would continue at a low level under McNamara.

=== Conventional flexible response ===
==== Two-and-a-half war doctrine ====
Flexible response strategy specified that the US should have the peacetime capability to fight two large regional wars and a small brushfire war at the same time. The consequence of this was to increase recruiting, investment, and research.

==== Counter-insurgency ====
The Kennedy administration placed particular emphasis on improving the ability to counter communist "wars of national liberation", in which the enemy avoided head-on military confrontation and resorted to political subversion and guerrilla tactics. As McNamara said in his 1962 annual report, "The military tactics are those of the sniper, the ambush, and the raid. The political tactics are terror, extortion, and assassination." In practical terms, this meant training and equipping U.S. military personnel as well as allies, such as South Vietnam, for those same exact kinds of counterinsurgency operations. Kennedy was fascinated with counterinsurgency warfare, and made a major push to develop the Special Forces, popularly known as the Green Berets.

Increased attention to conventional strength complemented these special forces preparations. In this instance, McNamara called up reserves and also proceeded to expand the regular armed forces. Whereas active duty strength had declined from approximately 3,555,000 to 2,483,000 between 1953 (the end of the Korean War) and 1961, it increased to nearly 2,808,000 by June 30, 1962. Then the forces leveled off at around 2,700,000 until the Vietnam military buildup began in 1965, reaching a peak of nearly 3,550,000 by mid-1968, just after McNamara left office. The U.S. Army leadership was, for the most part, strongly opposed to the counterinsurgency vogue, and stoutly resisted the presidential pressure for more counterinsurgency training and forces. The U.S. Army, for reasons of bureaucratic politics, budgetary reasons and sheer pride, wanted to be equipped to fight a conventional war in central Europe against the Soviet Army, with a large number of divisions armed with expensive hi-tech weapons designed for maximum firepower, instead of having small teams of Special Forces armed with relatively low tech weapons like assault rifles fight in a Third World country.

==== Combat commands ====
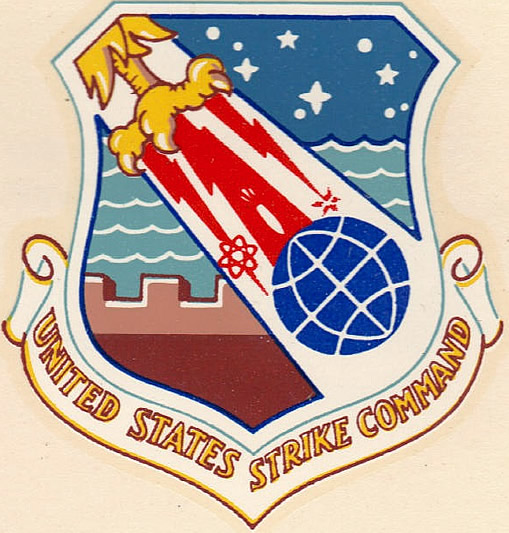

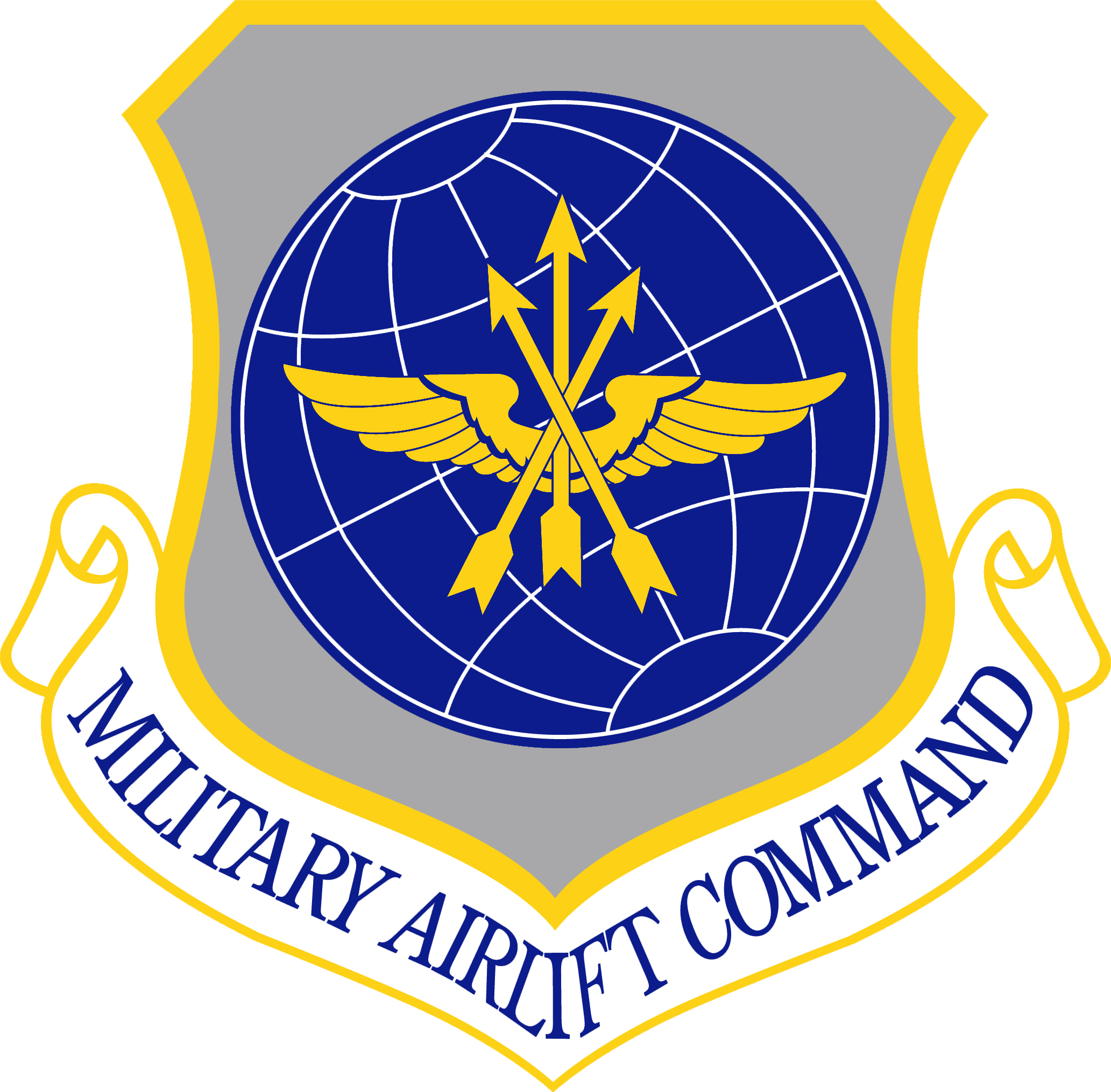

McNamara took other steps to increase U.S. deterrence posture and military capabilities. In December 1961, he established the United States Strike Command (STRICOM). Authorized to draw forces when needed from the Strategic Army Corps (STRAC), the Tactical Air Command (TAC), and the airlift units of the Military Air Transport Service (MATS) and the military services, Strike Command had the mission "to respond swiftly and with whatever force necessary to threats against the peace in any part of the world, reinforcing unified commands or... carrying out separate contingency operations."

On 8 January 1966, the Military Air Transport Service (MATS) would be replaced with the Military Airlift Command (MAC).

==== Strategic airlift ====
One of the first acts by McNamara's office was the approval of the Lockheed C-141 Starlifter production. This was followed by the development and procurement of the Lockheed C-5 Galaxy. Both aircraft were needed for the new flexible response strategy, and both marked the transition from propeller-driven to jet airlifters.

==== Airmobile divisions ====
McNamara very early developed concerns that Army procurement and tactics for aviation and especially helicopters were not aggressive enough, given the trends in Indochina and elsewhere. He bypassed Secretary of the Army Elvis Jacob Stahr Jr. by issuing an 16 April 1962 memorandum that ordered the formation of what became known as the Howze Board to develop a "new look" in Army aviation. The Board would develop the airmobile concept [i.e. helicopter rather than parachute delivery] for large-scale air assault and call for the formation of five airmobile divisions, though only the 101st Airborne Division would be implemented as such (the 1st Cavalry Division would also become an airmobile division, but only for the duration of the Vietnam War).

The Howze Board would also accelerate the development of attack helicopters, such as the eventually unsuccessful Lockheed AH-56 Cheyenne and the interim Bell AH-1 Cobra. McNamara would enthusiastically witness an early Cobra test flight, and would be attracted by the Cobra's 80% parts commonality with the Bell UH-1 Iroquois.

The M551 Sheridan Airborne Assault Vehicle was a light tank developed under McNamara for parachute or heavy-lift helicopter delivery with airborne divisions. It experienced development problems and would have a checkered deployment to Vietnam, though the 82nd Airborne Division would retain them until 1996.

==== Sealift and amphibious warfare ====
Under McNamara the Navy would begin or continue development or construction of a series of new higher-speed amphibious warfare ships, some of a highly innovative nature, though the actual numbers built would be small. (Note: The Navy's post-WW2 requirement for greater speed for amphibious warfare ships was intended to reduce their vulnerability to modern higher-speed conventionally powered submarines.) All of these ships were needed for the new flexible response strategy.

In an attempt to respond quickly to new conflicts, in 1961 the Defense Department began to consider pre-positioning Army materiel on strategic sealift ships, to be joined with soldiers flown in via airlifts. Twelve such ships would support an infantry division, replacing 87 WW2-era Victory ships. (Note: The strategic sealift ships would carry LARC amphibious vehicles, LCM-8 landing craft and Sikorsky CH-54 Tarhe heavy lift helicopters to offload cargo.) The Joint Chiefs in 1965 identified a need for 30 ships, Congress approved 2 in 1966, and McNamara announced the contract award on 20 July 1967; it would make use of McNamara's Total Package Procurement policy. Even though these ships were unable to directly participate in amphibious assaults, the Senate refused to fund any in the next two fiscal years and tried to rescind the 2 already approved due to rising antiwar sentiments.

==== Naval aviation ====
The first nuclear aircraft carrier, the Enterprise, was powered by an eight reactor plant, and would be completed during McNamara's first year in office. The carrier John F. Kennedy was alternatively designed as a nuclear carrier with four reactors, but McNamara ordered it to be laid down as a conventionally fueled ship to avoid higher initial costs. Secretary of the Navy Fred Korth resigned effective 1 November 1963 after he could not convince McNamara to reverse course on this and other policies, such as overall fleet replacement of aging ships and improved pay raises. McNamara refused Admiral Hyman Rickover's advocacy of incremental advancement in reactor design, such as the four reactor plant; (Note: Adm. Rickover's concern was that he did not know if the two-reactor plant advocated by McNamara was possible with the then-current technology: a two reactor plant would have to power the aircraft carrier with one reactor shut down under combat conditions, whereas a four reactor plant would have three reactors running with one down.) McNamara also refused to quantify most of the operational advantages of nuclear power for all surface ships, thus removing them from the systems analysis process. Opposition to his decisions mounted in Congress and the Navy. By August 1964 Harold Brown, the director of the Department of Defense Research and Engineering, told Rickover “Let’s face it, Bob [McNamara] made a mistake, and we have to get him off the hook” by developing the two reactor plant. McNamara would then approve use of the two reactor plant in what would become the Nimitz class of aircraft carriers.

==== Other naval construction ====
The Kennedy administration had inherited the RIM-50 Typhon antiaircraft missile system project, which would use an electronically scanned array radar to prevent the saturation of ships' defenses. (Note: The early Navy antiaircraft missiles, the RIM-2 Terrier, RIM-8 Talos and RIM-24 Tartar were all initially guided to their targets via mechanically steerable radar illuminators (e.g. AN/SPG-51); all ships had a limited number of such radars, thus restricting the number of missiles which could be guided at any one time and leaving the ship open to a saturation attack.) Cost overruns combined with the technical issues encountered during development led to the program being cancelled in November 1963. (Note: Typhon would be succeeded by the successful Aegis Combat System.) This ended the construction of new cruisers as such: all later ships designated as cruisers were designed with destroyer characteristics, with less capabilities. In May 1966, Representative L. Mendel Rivers wrote legal language that mandated the development of the California class nuclear cruisers due to his experience with McNamara's delaying tactics.

The Knox-class ocean escorts (reclassed as frigates in 1975) were designed before 1965 with several economies imposed by McNamara; their lower performance in comparison to their predecessors earned them the Navy nickname McNaramara's Folly (not to be confused with McNamara's Project 100,000, which was later given the same sobriquet).

By 1967 the massive costs of the Vietnam War, both budgetary and inflationary, (Note: The 1966–1970 modernization of the carrier Midway ballooned from $88 million to $202 million in part from inflation.) forced McNamara to reduce or cancel planned modernizations of several frontline ships, including the carrier Franklin D. Roosevelt, and the Boston class and Albany class guided missile cruisers.

=== Reorganizations ===
==== Tactical airlift ====
On 6 April 1966, Air Force Chief of Staff John P. McConnell and Army Chief of Staff Harold K. Johnson concluded the Johnson-McConnell agreement of 1966, which transferred Army fixed-wing tactical airlift assets to the Air Force after years of inter-service squabbling. Joint Chiefs Chairman Earle Wheeler encouraged the agreement so that Secretary McNamara and the other Chiefs would not become involved.

==== Support commands and agencies ====

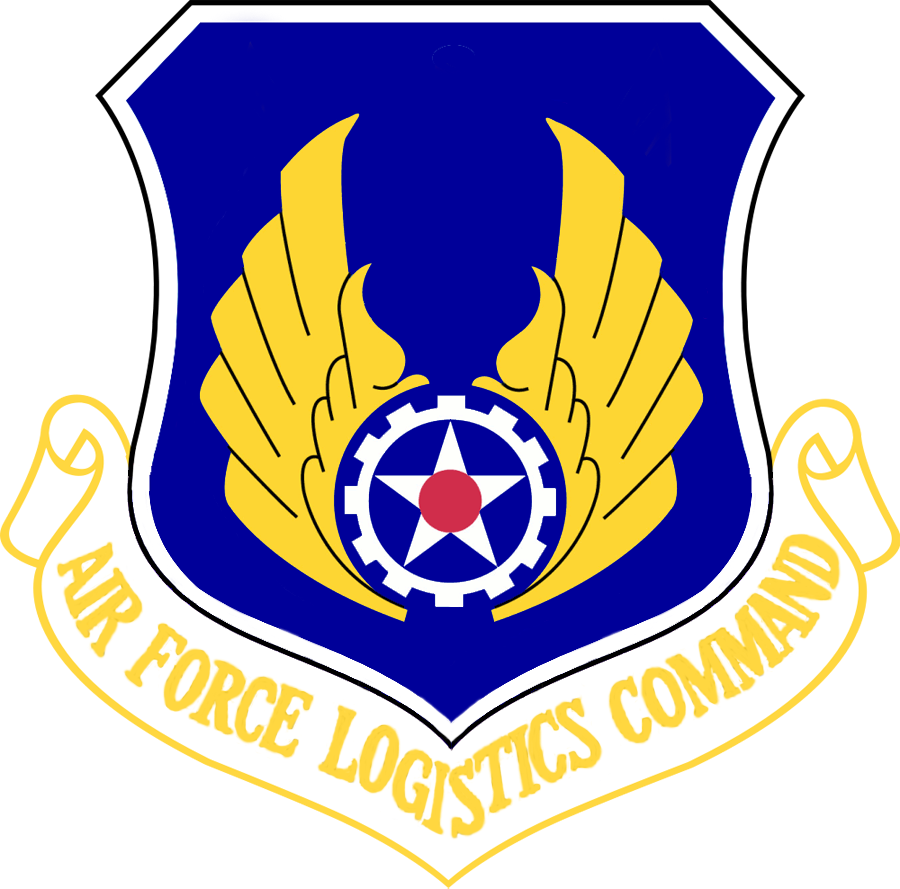

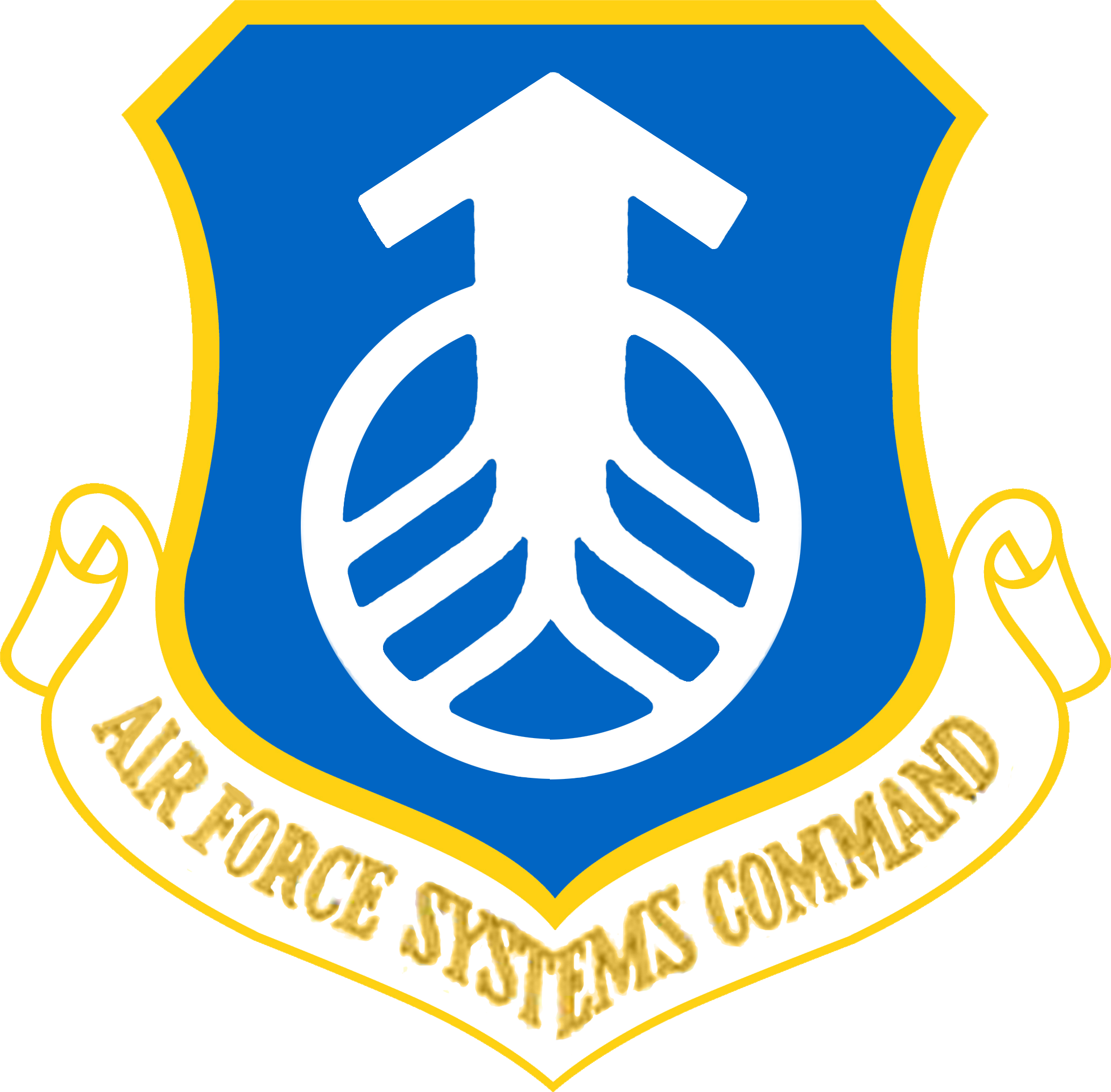

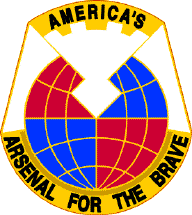
Army Materiel Command

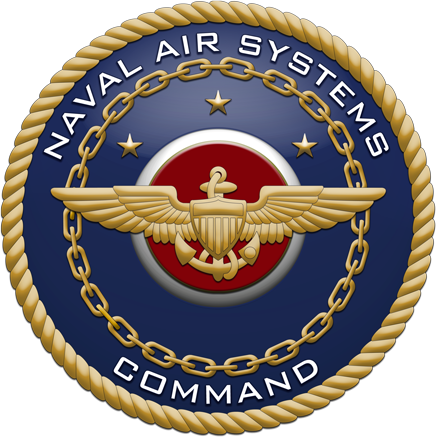

After reviewing the separate and often uncoordinated service efforts in intelligence, McNamara in February 1961 began the consolidation of these functions into the Defense Intelligence Agency, having it report to the Secretary of Defense through the JCS. The end effect was to remove the Intelligence function from the control of the military and to put it under the control of the Secretary of Defense.

On 31 August 1961, McNamara set up the Defense Supply Agency to work toward unified supply procurement, distribution, and inventory management under the control of the Secretary of Defense rather than the uniformed military.

On 6 September 1961, the Office of Missile and Satellite Systems became the National Reconnaissance Office and reported to the Secretary of Defense, taking over all space reconnaissance programs, such as Samos and Corona. Only MIDAS early-warning missile-launch detection satellites and the Vela nuclear detonation detection satellites remained in the Air Force's satellite inventory.

In another reorganization in 1961, the Air Materiel Command was re-designated as the Air Force Logistics Command (AFLC), while the Air Research and Development Command, gaining responsibility for weapon system development and acquisition, was re-designated as the Air Force Systems Command (AFSC) under General Bernard Schriever. The flexibility of Systems Command program managers was sharply curtailed under the Total Package Procurement policy instituted by McNamara. (Note: Neil Sheehan wrote of the officer who led the U.S. ICBM development: “[Gen. Bernard] Schriever did not get along with Robert McNamara and the civilian “Whiz Kids” from the RAND Corporation whom McNamara brought into the Pentagon with him to organize a new Systems Analysis Division. These self-styled experts on military affairs had no respect for experience and considered seasoned senior officers like Schriever dinosaurs who ought to quietly fade into extinction. They claimed to base their decisions on statistical analysis and other mathematical factors. To Schriever’s mind they acted from preconceived and untried notions that they packaged in statistical wrapping. He found himself being constantly harassed and overruled.”)

The Army Materiel Command (AMC) was established on 8 May 1962, and later was activated on 1 August of that year as a major field command of the U.S. Army for weapon system development and acquisition.

The bureau system was the Navy's materiel-support organization from 1842. It was responsible for the design of all ships, aircraft, and weapons. (Note: The Navy bureau chiefs were largely autonomous, reporting directly to the Secretary of the Navy and managing their respective organizations without the influence of other bureaus, a situation which led to mis-coordinations before and during WW2.) In 1966, the bureaus were gradually replaced by unified commands (generally known as "systems commands" or SYSCOMs) reporting to the Chief of Naval Operations. Consequently, the Ship Characteristics Board, which was the postwar coordinator between the bureaus, became less relevant; its focus changed from design and development to procurement and budget compliance.

Prior to 1962 each military service used a unique system to designate aircraft. On 18 September 1962, a unified Tri-Service aircraft designation system was adopted. Anecdotally, the Tri-Service system was partly brought about due to McNamara's confusion and frustration with the different designation systems the Navy and Air Force used at the time. (Note: A prime example of this confusion was the brief time the Phantom II would be designated the F-4H Phantom II by the Navy and the F-110 Spectre by the Air Force.) A similar missile and rocket designation system was adopted on 11 December 1962.

=== Systems analysis ===
McNamara's institution of systems analysis as a basis for making key decisions on force requirements, weapon systems, and other matters occasioned much debate. Two of its main practitioners during the McNamara era, Alain C. Enthoven and K. Wayne Smith, described the concept as follows: "First, the word 'systems' indicates that every decision should be considered in as broad a context as necessary... The word 'analysis' emphasizes the need to reduce a complex problem to its component parts for better understanding. Systems analysis takes a complex problem and sorts out the tangle of significant factors so that each can be studied by the method most appropriate to it." Enthoven and Smith said they used mainly civilians as systems analysts because they could apply independent points of view to force planning. McNamara's tendency to take military advice into less account than had previous secretaries and to override military opinions contributed to his unpopularity with service leaders. It was also generally thought that Systems Analysis, rather than being objective, was tailored by the civilians to support decisions that McNamara had already made.

The most notable example of systems analysis was the Planning, Programming and Budgeting System (PPBS) instituted by DoD Comptroller Charles J. Hitch. McNamara directed Hitch to analyze defense requirements systematically and produce a long-term, program-oriented defense budget. PPBS evolved to become the heart of the McNamara management program. According to Enthoven and Smith, the basic ideas of PPBS were: "the attempt to put defense program issues into a broader context and to search for explicit measures of national need and adequacy"; "consideration of military needs and costs together"; "explicit consideration of alternatives at the top decision level"; "the active use of an analytical staff at the top policymaking levels"; "a plan combining both forces and costs which projected into the future the foreseeable implications of current decisions"; and "open and explicit analysis, that is, each analysis should be made available to all interested parties, so that they can examine the calculations, data, and assumptions and retrace the steps leading to the conclusions." In practice, the data produced by the analysis was so large and so complex that while it was available to all interested parties, none of them could challenge the conclusions.

Among the management tools developed to implement PPBS were the Five Year Defense Plan (FYDP), the Draft Presidential Memorandum (DPM), the Readiness, Information and Control Tables, and the Development Concept Paper (DCP). The annual FYDP was a series of tables projecting forces for eight years and costs and manpower for five years in mission-oriented, rather than individual service, programs. By 1968, the FYDP covered ten military areas: strategic forces, general-purpose forces, intelligence and communications, airlift and sealift, guard and reserve forces, research and development, central supply and maintenance, training and medical services, administration and related activities, and support of other nations.

The Draft Presidential Memorandum (DPM)—intended for the White House and usually prepared by the systems analysis office—was a method to study and analyze major defense issues. Sixteen DPMs appeared between 1961 and 1968 on such topics as strategic offensive and defensive forces, NATO strategy and force structure, military assistance, and tactical air forces. OSD sent the DPMs to the services and the Joint Chief of Staff (JCS) for comment; in making decisions, McNamara included in the DPM a statement of alternative approaches, force levels, and other factors. The DPM in its final form became a decision document. The DPM was hated by the JCS and uniformed military in that it cut their ability to communicate directly to the White House. The DPMs were also disliked because the systems analysis process was so heavyweight that it was impossible for any service to effectively challenge its conclusions.

The Development Concept Paper examined performance, schedule, cost estimates, and technical risks to provide a basis for determining whether to begin or continue a research and development program. But in practice, it proved to be a cost burden that became a barrier to entry for companies attempting to deal with the military. It aided the trend toward a few large non-competitive defense contractors serving the military. Rather than serving any useful purpose, the overhead necessary to generate information that was often in practice ignored resulted in increased costs throughout the system.

The Readiness, Information, and Control Tables provided data on specific projects, more detailed than in the FYDP, such as the tables for the Southeast Asia Deployment Plan, which recorded by month and quarter the schedule for deployment, consumption rates, and future projections of U.S. forces in Southeast Asia.

==== Systems acquisition ====
Total Package Procurement (TPP or alternatively TPPC) was a major systems acquisition policy introduced by MacNamara. It attempted to avoid the costs of prototyping weapon systems by instituting detailed paper studies for weapons design; however this led to large cost increases in the paper studies and undiscovered problems in production. Notable programs that encountered major problems with the TPP approach were the General Dynamics F-111, the Lockheed C-5 Galaxy, the Boeing AGM-69 SRAM, the Lockheed AH-56 Cheyenne, the MBT-70 main battle tank, the Tarawa-class amphibious assault ships, and the Spruance-class destroyers; total cost overruns of all programs reached a minimum of $10 billion. TPP would be judged a failure and abandoned in 1970.

=== Cost reductions ===
McNamara's staff stressed systems analysis as an aid in decision-making on weapon development and many other budget issues. The secretary believed that the United States could afford any amount needed for national security, but that "this ability does not excuse us from applying strict standards of effectiveness and efficiency to the way we spend our defense dollars.... You have to make a judgment on how much is enough. Acting on these principles, McNamara instituted a much-publicized cost reduction program, which, he reported, saved $14 billion in the five-year period beginning in 1961. Although he had to withstand a storm of criticism from senators and representatives from affected congressional districts, he closed many military bases and installations that he judged unnecessary for national security.

Due to the nuclear arms race, the Vietnam War buildup and other projects, Total Obligational Authority (TOA) increased greatly during the McNamara years. Fiscal year TOA increased from $48.4 billion in 1962 (equal to $394 billion in 2025) to $49.5 ($385) billion in 1965 (before the major Vietnam increases) to $74.9 ($528) billion in 1968, McNamara's last year in office (though he left office in February). Not until FY 1984 did DoD's total obligational authority surpass that of FY 1968 in constant dollars.

==== False reporting ====
Some of McNamara's cost containment involved deceit. A month after taking office, Lyndon Johnson worried that he would have to report a cost overrun of $400 million in defense spending for fiscal 1964. McNamara volunteered to deliberately underestimate what money was spent for defense and later feign surprise when spending exceeded his department's forecast.

==== Attack submarines ====
Before McNamara took office the Navy had identified a need for 105 attack submarines, both conventional and nuclear, with nuclear boats replacing the conventional boats as they retired. McNamara came to see the nuclear attack submarine program as a major drain on the DoD budget, and he repeatedly attempted to stop production at 65 submarines. He ordered the end of nuclear submarine construction at the two naval shipyards, and by the time he left office the number of civilian yards building them had been reduced from five to two. (Note: The yards which ended nuclear sub production were Mare Island Naval Shipyard and Portsmouth Naval Shipyard, then Fore River Shipyard, Ingalls Shipbuilding, and New York Shipbuilding Corporation; only General Dynamics Electric Boat and Newport News Shipbuilding continued production.) His systems analysts repeatedly downplayed Navy estimates of possible requirements and rejected wargaming as a means of supporting those estimates despite the Navy's WW2 successes with wargaming; at one point McNamara's analysts estimated that U.S. submarines would sink 25 Soviet subs for every single loss of their own in a conflict due to better U.S. technology, a ratio the Navy found impossible. In 1966 McNamara responded to budgetary pressures by ordering the retirement of many conventional submarines without the nuclear replacements the Navy desired. (Note: The only retained conventional attack submarines were the GUPPY subs, the 6 Tang class, the 2 Sailfish class, the Darter, and the 3 Barbel class.) He also attempted to delay any new follow-on class to the Sturgeon class by ordering multiple repeated paper studies. Congress resisted his efforts to end nuclear attack submarine production out of fears that the industrial base would be imperiled.

Admiral Hyman Rickover was charged in 1964 with reducing the cost and improving the silencing of nuclear submarines. This led him to propose the turbo-electric drive submarine, or TEDS, a variant of the Sturgeon class with a direct current electric drive rather than a geared turbine. It would have no gear whine and offer safety benefits. (Note: The TEDS submarine could in an emergency reverse thrust simply by reversing the electric polarity of the engines.) McNamara opposed the construction of this experimental but operational submarine but was overruled by Congress in 1967 at Rickover's recommendation. (Note: Adm. Rickover was able to use his assignment within the Atomic Energy Commission to gain some independence from the DoD) The TEDS would be built as the Glenard P. Lipscomb after he left office, but would suffer from technical problems and lower speed. The fight with Congress over the TEDS resulted in McNamara realizing his influence was receding, and so he allowed the Sturgeon follow-on Los Angeles class to move forward to production.

==== Interceptors and reconnaissance aircraft ====
On 14 May 1965, the Air Force placed a production order for 93 Lockheed F-12B Mach 3+ interceptors for its Air Defense Command (ADC). However, McNamara would not release the funding for three consecutive years due to Vietnam War costs. In his last month in office, on 5 February 1968, McNamara ordered Lockheed to destroy A-12, YF-12 and SR-71 tooling.

==== Cancellation and early retirement of bombers ====
McNamara would prove skeptical of most advanced bomber proposals; very few would survive scrutiny under his tenure.

- ANP project: at McNamara's urging, President Kennedy canceled the Aircraft Nuclear Propulsion project on 26 March 1961. General LeMay had planned on it leading to a nuclear-powered strategic bomber.
- B-70: on McNamara's recommendation (and against General LeMay's) President Kennedy on 28 March 1961 reduced the supersonic North American B-70 Valkyrie project to experimental following the Soviet demonstration of effective high altitude anti-aircraft missiles. McNamara fully supported the decision in Congressional hearings, calling the bomber unjustifiable.
- A-5: in 1963 the Navy would end the strategic bombing role for its aircraft carriers; the supersonic North American A-5 Vigilante would be converted to the strategic reconnaissance role.
- B-1: the Air Force would begin studies of a low-level penetration bomber in 1961 which became the B-1, but McNamara in 1964 limited this AMSA program to studies and component development.
- SLAM: the U.S. government in 1955 began development under Project Pluto of a nuclear ramjet powered supersonic low altitude cruise missile (SLAM), although it was to drop nuclear bombs like a conventional bomber. Several member of Congress, including Representative Melvin Price, tried to keep the program alive in early 1964 in an attempt to force McNamara to reverse his unwillingness to announce a consistent defense technology-development policy. McNamara canceled the project on 1 July 1964.
- B-58: McNamara was an early opponent of the Convair B-58 Hustler, the Air Force's first supersonic bomber. It had an operating cost one-third greater than the Boeing B-52 Stratofortress, and he did not consider it a viable weapon system due to limited range that was overcome at the cost of additional midair refueling tankers. This view was shared by General LeMay, who nonetheless had accepted the B-58 as an interim that would train crews for the planned successor B-70 Valkyrie. In late 1965, five years after it became operational, McNamara ordered retirement of the B-58 by 1970; the principal reasons given for this directive was the high sustainment cost for the fleet and the planned introduction of the replacement FB-111A. (Note: Ironically, McNamara's successor Melvin Laird would reduce McNamara's planned purchase of the FB-111A on exactly the same grounds as McNamara's B-58 retirement.)
- AGM-28: on 22 September 1966 McNamara recommended retiring all of the remaining B-52-carried AGM-28 Hound Dog air launched cruise missiles (ALCMs) within a few years. McNamara's recommendation was not acted upon – no replacement was yet available – and the Hound Dog remained in service. He had previously canceled the Hound Dog's replacement, the AGM-48 Skybolt ALBM.

==== Program consolidations ====
One major hallmark of McNamara's cost reductions was the consolidation of programs from different services, most visibly in small arms and aircraft acquisition, believing that the redundancy created waste and unnecessary spending.

McNamara's actions in mandating a premature across-the-board adoption of the untested M16 rifle proved catastrophic when the weapons began to fail in combat, though later congressional investigations revealed the causes of these failures as negligence and borderline sabotage on behalf of the Army ordnance corps' officers.

McNamara directed the Air Force to adopt the Navy's McDonnell F-4 Phantom II multi-role and LTV A-7 Corsair II attack combat aircraft, consolidations that were quite successful, and the success was bidirectional: the Navy would later adopt improvements first made by the Air Force.

- The Phantom II USAF adoption was part of McNamara's November 1961 decision to end production of the Republic F-105 Thunderchief fighter bomber and the Convair F-106 Delta Dart interceptor. (Note: The F-106 production would briefly continue and service would continue until 1988 due to demands for the F-4 in Vietnam.)
- The Air Force still saw the A-7 Corsair as needing improvement, so on 8 September 1966, General John P. McConnell, Chief of Staff of the USAF, ordered that a specialized close air support aircraft be designed, developed, and obtained. This became the A-X program, and led to a fly-off between the A-7 Corsair, the Northrop A-9, and the Fairchild Republic A-10 Thunderbolt II after McNamara left office.

==== Program consolidation – F-111 ====
On 14 February 1961 McNamara merged two development programs into the TFX Program dual service project, later known as the F-111. He combined Navy requirements for a Fleet Air Defense (FAD) aircraft – the original proposal, the Douglas F6D Missileer, would be cancelled in December 1961 – and Air Force requirements for a low-level bomber. His experience in the corporate world led him to believe that adopting a single type for different missions and services would save money. He insisted on the General Dynamics Model 12 entry over the DoD's preference for Boeing's lower bid Model 818 because of greater commonality advantages. Though heralded as a fighter that could do everything (fast supersonic dash, slow carrier and short airfield landings, tactical strike and even close air support), in the end it involved too many compromises to fully succeed at all of them. The Navy FAD version (F-111B) was drastically overweight and difficult to land on carriers, and eventually canceled after the new Energy–maneuverability (E-M) theory showed it was incapable of matching the abilities of current and newly revealed Soviet aircraft. (Note: In an autumn 1964 briefing for USAF Tactical Air Command Gen. Walter C. Sweeney Jr., Maj. John Boyd, the primary developer of the Energy–maneuverability theory, demonstrated that the F-111 would be shot down by any contemporary Soviet fighter in any situation. Boyd was later ordered by the Air Force Chief of Staff to remove the derogatory information about the F-111 from his E-M presentations.) (Note: One month after McNamara left office as Secretary of Defense, Adm. Thomas F. Connolly reversed his previous Congressional testimony on the F-111B by telling the Senate Armed Services committee "There isn't enough [engine] power in all Christendom to make that airplane what we want!") The aircraft eventually found niches as a tactical interdiction bomber (F-111A), a light strategic bomber (FB-111A), and an electronic warfare aircraft (EF-111A) with the Air Force. (Note: However, many analysts believe that even though the TFX project itself was a partial failure, McNamara was ahead of his time as the trend in fighter design has continued toward consolidation—the F-16 Falcon and F/A-18 Hornet emerged as multi-role fighters, and most modern designs combine many of the roles the TFX would have had. In many ways, the Joint Strike Fighter is seen as a rebirth of the TFX project, according to defense analyst David S. Grantham, in that it purports to satisfy the needs of three American air arms (as well as several foreign customers), fulfilling the roles of strike fighter, carrier-launched fighter, V/STOL, and close air support (and drawing many criticisms similar to those leveled against the TFX).)

In April 1965, Harold Brown, the director of the Department of Defense Research and Engineering, began studies of a new F-X fighter for the Air Force. In early 1967 the Navy decided the F-111 would not meet their requirements and began the development of a new dedicated fighter design, the VFAX program. McNamara again asked the forces to study the designs and see whether the VFAX would meet the Air Force's F-X needs. The resulting studies took 18 months and concluded that the desired features were too different; the Navy stressed loiter time and mission flexibility, while the Air Force due to its Vietnam experience was now looking primarily for maneuverability. The VFAX would become the Grumman F-14 Tomcat and the F-X would become the McDonnell Douglas F-15 Eagle.

=== Foreign basing ===
==== Diego Garcia ====
In July 1961, McNamara was informed by the British Defence Minister, Peter Thorneycroft, that the financial burden of trying to maintain British forces around the world was too much, and that the British Prime Minister Harold Macmillan was considering a withdrawal of all British forces "East of Suez" to end the British military presence in Asia. McNamara was opposed to this and the U.S. Navy began lobbying for Britain to allow an American naval base to be set up in the Indian Ocean. This was endorsed in a Joint Chiefs of Staff memo in January 1962 which expressed concern with the rise nationalist movements in British colonies, that could seek the withdrawal of American forces.

In September 1962, Thorneycroft visited Washington to meet McNamara and to begin talks over which British island in the Indian Ocean was to have the American base. By 1963, the Americans had selected the island of Diego Garcia in the Chagos Archipelago, which was part of the Crown colony of British Mauritius as the ideal place for air and naval bases. McNamara offered to have the United States pay $15 million U.S. dollars annually in rent to the British government for a base on Diego Garcia, a sum that was agreeable to London. In 1965, the Chagos Islands were severed from the Mauritius colony (which gained independence in March 1968 and would claim the Chagos Islands as its own territory through the 2020s) and turned into the British Indian Ocean Territory as the prelude for the projected American base.

In 1966, in a meeting with Defence Minister Denis Healey, McNamara pressed for the British to remain in Asia, saying he wanted them to keep their base in Singapore. Healey offered evasive answers, claiming that his government wanted to keep the Singapore base, but its financial costs were draining the British exchequer. In July 1966, McNamara told Johnson that it was "absolutely essential" for the British to remain "East of Suez", citing political rather military reasons, namely that it showed the importance of the region, which thus justified the America's involvement in Vietnam. To placate the Americans, the British were willing to offer a lease on Diego Garcia on almost any terms favorable to the Americans. The Americans informed the British that they wanted all of the native Chagossians expelled from the island, a request to which the British agreed. In January 1968, Wilson announced that with the exception of Hong Kong, all British forces would be withdrawn "East of Suez" in order to save money. Starting in 1968, British authorities began expelling the Chagossians from Diego Garcia, with the process completed by 1973.

== Wars and conflicts ==
=== Cold War ===
Aside from the nuclear arms race, the Cuban Missile Crisis and the war in Indochina (Laos and Vietnam), other conflicts that involved the U.S. Defense Department under Robert McNamara included support for the Cuban Bay of Pigs Invasion, confrontations at Guantanamo Bay Naval Base in Cuba, reconnaissance flights around the periphery of the Soviet Union and over China, the Congo Crisis, the Berlin Crisis of 1961, riots in the Panama Canal Zone, intervention in the Dominican Civil War, the anti-communist purge in Indonesia, the beginning of the Korean DMZ Conflict, and the USS Liberty incident. All but the Liberty incident were seen as part of the Cold War or potentially so.

=== Bay of Pigs ===
The CIA sponsored invasion of Cuba took place three months after McNamara took office as Defense Secretary. Prior to the invasion McNamara had not attended at least one critical meeting; after the invasion failed he expressed regret over his performance and committed himself to greater managerial oversight of military operations:

I had entered the Pentagon with a limited grasp of military affairs..This lack of understanding, coupled with my preoccupation with other matters...led me to accept the plan uncritically...I had even passed along to the president, without comment, an ambiguous assessment by the Joint Chiefs that the invasion would probably contribute to Castro’s overthrow even if it did not succeed right away. The truth is I did not understand the plan very well and did not know the facts. I had let myself become a passive bystander...the incident brought [Kennedy and me] closer. I made up my mind not to let him down again.

Following the failed invasion, McNamara would become involved in an oversight advisory role in Operation Mongoose, which was intended to cause the overthrow of the Castro regime via covert action, including assassinations. Mongoose operations would become one cause of the Soviet introduction of missiles to Cuba, which triggered the Cuban Missile Crisis. (Note: See Robert McNamara § Church Committee for the public disclosure of Operation Mongoose and for McNamara's attempt to redirect blame onto retired Gen. Lansdale for the disclosure implications.)

=== Cuban Missile Crisis ===
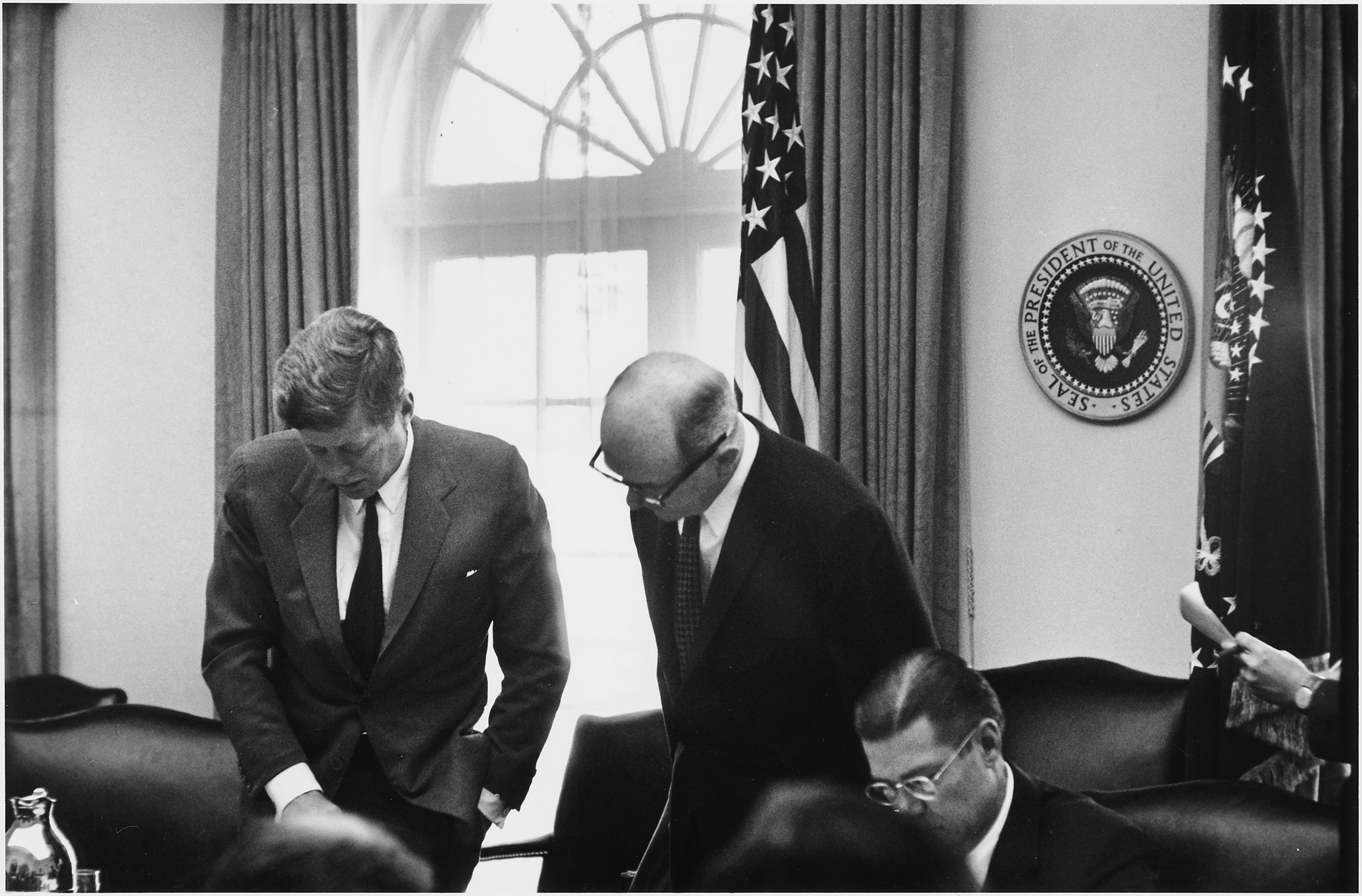
President Kennedy, Secretary of State Dean Rusk and McNamara in October 1962

The Cuban Missile Crisis was a nuclear standoff between the United States and the Soviet Union and lasted for 13 days in October 1962. When President Kennedy received confirmation of the placement of offensive Soviet missiles in Cuba, he immediately set up the 'Executive Committee', referred to as 'ExComm'. This committee included United States government officials, such as Robert McNamara, advising Kennedy on the crisis. Kennedy instructed ExComm to immediately come up with a response to the Soviet threat unanimously without him present.

The Joint Chiefs of Staff favored launching air strikes against the Soviet missile sites in Cuba, an opinion that McNamara initially agreed with. (Note: The historian Max Boot would write that McNamara and Robert Kennedy "later adjusted their recollections to excise their hawkish proposals" for a bombing strike against Cuba during the Missile Crisis.) He later advised Kennedy against the chiefs, warning that air strikes would almost certainly be metaphorically crossing the Rubicon. On Tuesday 16 October, ExComm had their first meeting. The majority of officials favored an air attack on Cuba in hopes to destroy the missile sites, although the vote was not unanimous which brought them to other alternatives. By the end of the week, ExComm came up with four different alternative strategies to present to the president: a blockade, an air strike, an invasion, or some combination of these. These actions are known as OPLAN 312, OPLAN 314 and OPLAN 316. A quarantine was a way to prevent the Soviets from bringing any military equipment in or out of Cuba; the word 'quarantine' had been recommended by Admiral George Anderson because a blockade is considered an act of war. During the final review of both alternatives on Sunday 21 October, upon Kennedy's request, McNamara presented the argument against the attack and for the quarantine. On Wednesday 24 October at 10:00 am EDT, the quarantine line around Cuba went into effect.

McNamara's relations with the hawkish Joint Chiefs of Staff had been strained during the crisis, and his relations with Admiral Anderson and General Curtis LeMay were especially testy. Both Anderson and LeMay had favored invading Cuba, welcoming the prospects of a war with the Soviet Union, under the grounds that a war with them was already inevitable, and whose attitudes towards Kennedy and McNamara had verged on insubordination. Reportedly, Anderson had at a one-point ordered McNamara out of the Naval Operations Room, saying that as a civilian he was unqualified to be making decisions about naval matters, leading McNamara to say that he was the Defense Secretary and Anderson was unqualified to be ordering him to do anything. Anderson had a different recollection of the 24 October incident, and would later accuse McNamara of micromanagement:

We knew where one of these particular [Soviet] submarines was located...We had a destroyer sitting on top of this submarine. One evening, McNamara, [Deputy Secretary of Defense Ross] Gilpatric, and an entourage of his press people came down to flag plot and, in the course of their interrogations, they asked why that destroyer was out of line [the picket line of quarantine]...After some discussion, I said to McNamara—he kept pressing me— ’’Come inside,” and I took him into a little inner sanctuary [because the press people were not cleared for the classified submarine tracking information] and I explained the whole thing to him and to his satisfaction, as well. He left, and we walked down the corridor, and I said: “Well, Mr. Secretary, you go back to your office and I’ll go to mine and we’ll take care of things,”...which apparently was the wrong thing to say to somebody of McNamara’s personality...The story was leaked to the press through his own public information people that I had insulted him by making this remark over the incident in flag plot.

Although American defense planning focused on using nuclear weapons, Kennedy and McNamara clearly saw that the use of strategic weapons could be suicidal. Following the crisis aftermath, McNamara stated, "There is no such thing as strategy, only crisis management."

After the crisis, McNamara recommended to Kennedy that Admiral Anderson and General LeMay be sacked. However, Kennedy was afraid of a Congressional backlash if he sacked two of the chiefs at once. Moreover, Kennedy did not wish for his disagreements with the Joint Chiefs to become public and felt that sacking two of the chiefs at once would lead to speculation in the media about such a disagreement. Kennedy told McNamara: "All right, you can fire one. Which one will it be?" Without hesitation, McNamara answered "Anderson". Despite this reputed agreement Anderson would remain as CNO for almost a year, (Note: Six months after the Missile Crisis Adm. Anderson would have another conflict with McNamara over his press conference on the Thresher loss, see George Whelan Anderson Jr. § USS Thresher loss) until August 1963, after he was nominated to be the new American ambassador to Portugal. Anderson would later claim that McNamara attempted to stop the appointment to Portugal.

=== Vietnam War ===
==== Background ====
The Truman and Eisenhower administrations had committed the U.S. to support the French and native anti-Communist forces in Vietnam in resisting efforts by the Communists in the North to unify the country. Aid was initially limited to financial support, military advice and covert intelligence gathering, but expanded after 1954 when the French withdrew. The U.S. Military Assistance Advisory Group (MAAG) Vietnam was established on 1 November 1955. CIA advisor Rufus Phillips would later maintain that the Viet Minh had largely been defeated in the South by 1956 via civic action programs, but the U.S. bureaucracies subsequently squandered the victory with inappropriate policies and advice. In December 1956, the North Vietnamese government authorized Viet Cong forces in South Vietnam to begin a low-level insurgency. The Pentagon Papers later stated: “All evidence points to fall 1959 as the period in which the Viet Cong made their transition from a clandestine political movement to a more overt military operation...[b]y autumn 1959, however, the VC were in a position to field units of battalion size against regular army formations.”

During President John F. Kennedy's term, from 1961 to 1963, American troops in South Vietnam increased from 900 to 16,000 advisers. Kennedy established the Military Assistance Command, Vietnam (MACV) on 8 February 1962, sending Americans to train the Army of the Republic of Vietnam (ARVN). McNamara was closely aligned with Dean Rusk, the Secretary of State, with both favoring greater American support for South Vietnam.

The Gulf of Tonkin incidents in August 1964, which involved two purported attacks on U.S. Navy destroyers by North Vietnamese naval vessels, led to an escalation of U.S. involvement in Vietnam.

==== Laos ====
Initially, the main concern of the new Kennedy administration was Laos, not South Vietnam. In February 1961, McNamara spoke in favor of intervention in Laos, saying that six AT-6 planes owned by the CIA could be fitted to carry 200-pound bombs in support of General Phoumi Nosavan's forces. Rusk shot down that proposal, saying his World War II experiences in Burma had taught him that bombing was ineffective in the jungles and six planes were not enough. In the spring of 1961 Kennedy seriously considered intervening in Laos where the Communist Pathet Lao, supported by North Vietnam, were winning the civil war. At one point, the Joint Chiefs of Staff advised sending 60,000 U.S. troops into Laos. However, Laos appeared to be an undeveloped, landlocked country with barely any modern roads and only two modern airfields which were both small by Western standards and would have caused logistical problems. Furthermore, memories of the Korean War were still fresh, and it was generally accepted if the United States sent in troops into Laos, it was almost certain to provoke Chinese intervention and lead to another confrontation with the country. The Southeast Asia Treaty Organization (SEATO) was split with its European members such as France and Britain in opposition to the intervention and its Asian members such as Thailand and the Philippines in support. McNamara noted to Kennedy it was quite possible that the two airfields in Laos could be seized by the Communist forces, which would cut off any U.S. forces in Laos and turn the intervention into a debacle. At a meeting on 29 April 1961, when questioned by Attorney General Robert F. Kennedy, McNamara stated that "we should take a stand in Thailand and South Vietnam", pointedly omitting Laos from the nations in Southeast Asia to risk a war over.

McNamara soon changed his mind about Laos. On 1 May 1961, he advised Kennedy to send in ground troops into Laos, saying "we must be prepared to win", and advising using nuclear weapons if China should intervene. On 2 May, McNamara, using more strong language, told Kennedy that the United States should definitely intervene in Laos, even though he was very certain that it would lead to Chinese intervention, concluding that "at some point, we may have to initiate the use of nuclear weapons to prevent the defeat of our forces". Kennedy, who was distrustful of the hawkish advice given by the Joint Chiefs of Staff after the failure of the Bay of Pigs invasion, instead decided to seek a diplomatic solution to the Laos crisis at a peace conference in Geneva in 1961–62 that ultimately led to an agreement to make Laos officially neutral in the Cold War. The problems posed by the possibility of a war with China and the logistical problems of supporting a large units of troops in Laos led McNamara ultimately to favor an alternative strategy of stationing a small number of U.S. Army Special Forces in Laos to work with American allies such as the Hmong hill tribes. On 29 September 1961, the Joint Chiefs of Staff estimated to McNamara that if Chinese forces entered Laos, then SEATO forces would need at least 15 divisions consisting of some 278, 000 men to stop them. At the same time, the Joint Chiefs also estimated that the two airfields in Laos were capable of landing some 1,000 troops a day each, which would give the advantage to the Chinese. Such dire assessments led Kennedy to ignore McNamara and the Joint Chiefs, and to favor a diplomatic solution to the Laos crisis.

Though McNamara had supported plans to intervene in Laos in 1961, by 1962 he had changed his mind. During a discussion with Chairman of the Joint Chiefs of Staff General Lyman Lemnitzer, McNamara had asked them what the United States would do with a hypothetical North Vietnamese intervention in the event of an American intervention into Laos, but none of them could provide an answer. The inability of the Joint Chiefs to answer McNamara's questions about what the United States should do if North Vietnam should stage a major offensive down the Mekong river valley from Laos into Cambodia and finally South Vietnam persuaded McNamara that the Joint Chiefs had no vision of the issues and were merely advocating intervention in Laos to avoid looking weak. (Note: It is possible that this "inability to answer McNamara's questions" is simply McNamara's own description of answers he did not like. Dean Rusk had asked Gen. Lemnitzer “Lem, do you think we can get the 101st [Airborne Division] in there?” Lemnitzer's response demonstrated he understood the difficulties of military operations in Laos: “We can get it in all right. It’s getting it out that I’m worried about.”)

==== Downing of Charles Klusmann over Laos ====
Operation Barrel Roll was a covert interdiction and close air support campaign conducted in Laos by the U.S. Air Force and U.S. Navy between 5 March 1964 and 29 March 1973. On 6 June 1964 (5 June in Hawaii) Navy reconnaissance pilot Lieutenant Charles Klusmann was shot down over the Laotian Plain of Jars. (Note: The downing of Lt. Klusmann's aircraft was in large measure the result of McNamara's insistence that the reconnaissance flights be conducted at the same time each day: "The proclivity of Secretary McNamara and his staff to designate TOTs [times-over-targets] plagued our armed forces for years".) McNamara ordered that no rescue attempt be made. Admiral Harry D. Felt called McNamara from Honolulu and told him he had no authority to issue such an order, that only the Commander-in-Chief could, and he repeatedly "asked" McNamara to put Lyndon Johnson on the line despite the 1:00 AM Washington time and McNamara's reluctance to do so. Johnson quickly came on-line and countermanded McNamara's order, but the delay resulted in the capture of Klusmann. Klusmann escaped three months later despite torture and starvation and was rescued, becoming one of only two Americans captured in Laos and held by the Pathet Lao to be returned. (Note: The other American to escape from captivity in Laos was Lt. Dieter Dengler USN.)

==== First Vietnam proposals ====
Air Force Brigadier General Edward Lansdale had been the architect of the defeat of the Philippine Hukbalahap rebellion in 1950–1954 and the Viet Minh defeats in South Vietnam in 1954–1956, in both cases employing civic action programs alongside low-level military security actions. In early 1961 he became the Assistant to the Secretary of Defense for Special Operations, and he briefed McNamara on the nature of the war in Vietnam. He showed McNamara examples of primitive homemade Viet Cong weaponry, and explained that the war was more a political war than military. He said “It doesn’t take weapons and uniforms and lots of food to win. It takes ideas and ideals.” After 10 minutes McNamara abruptly ended the briefing with the words "Is that all?" (Note: See McNamara fallacy § 1962 meeting with Edward Lansdale for another incident in which McNamara refused Gen. Lansdale's advice.)

In October 1961, when General Maxwell Taylor and State Department Counselor Walt Whitman Rostow advised sending 8,000 American combat troops to South Vietnam, McNamara rejected that recommendation as inadequate, stating that 8,000 troops would "probably not tip the scales decisively", instead recommending to Kennedy that he send six divisions to South Vietnam. Kennedy rejected that advice.

Army Chief of Staff General George Decker in April 1962 advised McNamara that “we cannot win a conventional war in Southeast Asia”; for this Decker was forced to retire halfway through his four-year term on 30 September 1962. He was replaced with Earle Wheeler, who as a former mathematics professor at West Point shared much of McNamara's views on analysis.

==== 1962 fact finding mission ====
In May 1962, McNamara paid his first visit to South Vietnam, where he told the press "every quantitative measurement...shows that we are winning the war". Led by General Paul D. Harkins, the officers of MACV altered a map that showed too much of South Vietnam under Viet Cong control, and massaged the statistics to make the VC appear weaker than they were. McNamara's "quantitative" style based upon number-crunching by computers about trends in Vietnam missed the human dimension. Aspects of the war such as popular views and attitudes in South Vietnam, and South Vietnamese president Ngô Đình Diệm's "divide and rule" strategy of having multiple government departments compete against one another as a way of staying in power were missed by McNamara's "quantitative" approach as there was no way that computers could calculate these aspects of the war.

MAAG commander Lieutenant General Lionel C. McGarr returned to the U.S. in July 1962. McNamara refused to consult with him about his experiences in Vietnam. By this time McGarr opposed any U.S. escalation of force. MAAG would be absorbed into MACV in May 1964.

In late 1962, McNamara ordered planners to assume the withdraw of American advisers from South Vietnam in 1964 as, according to Pentagon calculations, the war should be won by then. At the time, McNamara told Kennedy: "There is a new feeling of confidence that victory is possible".

==== Battle of Ap Bac ====
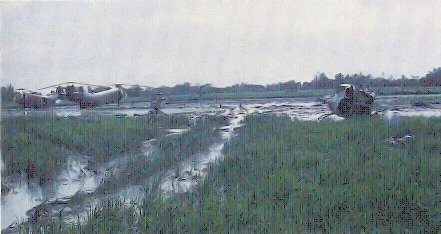
Downed CH-21s and a UH-1 Huey in the rice paddy at Ap Bac

On 2 January 1963, McNamara's rosy projections and assumptions based upon what his computers had told him about Vietnam were shattered by the Battle of Ap Bac when three VC companies were encircled by the ARVN's 7th Division in the village of Ap Bac. Despite being outnumbered by a ratio of 10–1 and being heavily outgunned, the VC defeated the 7th Division in the ensuing battle and escaped into the jungle, shooting down five U.S. aircraft in the process. Colonel John Paul Vann, the American adviser attached to the 7th Division summed up the battle in a report in his usual earthy language as: "A miserable fucking performance, just like what it always is". Vann, a colorful figure whose outspokenly blunt criticism of how the war was being fought made him a favorite of the media, was much disliked by McNamara, who did not appreciate the criticism as he continued to insist that the war was being won.

Vann's reports criticizing Diệm's regime as corrupt and incompetent were most unwelcome to McNamara who contended that the reforms advocated by Vann were unnecessary. In March 1963, Vann resigned from the Army.

==== The Buddhist crisis ====
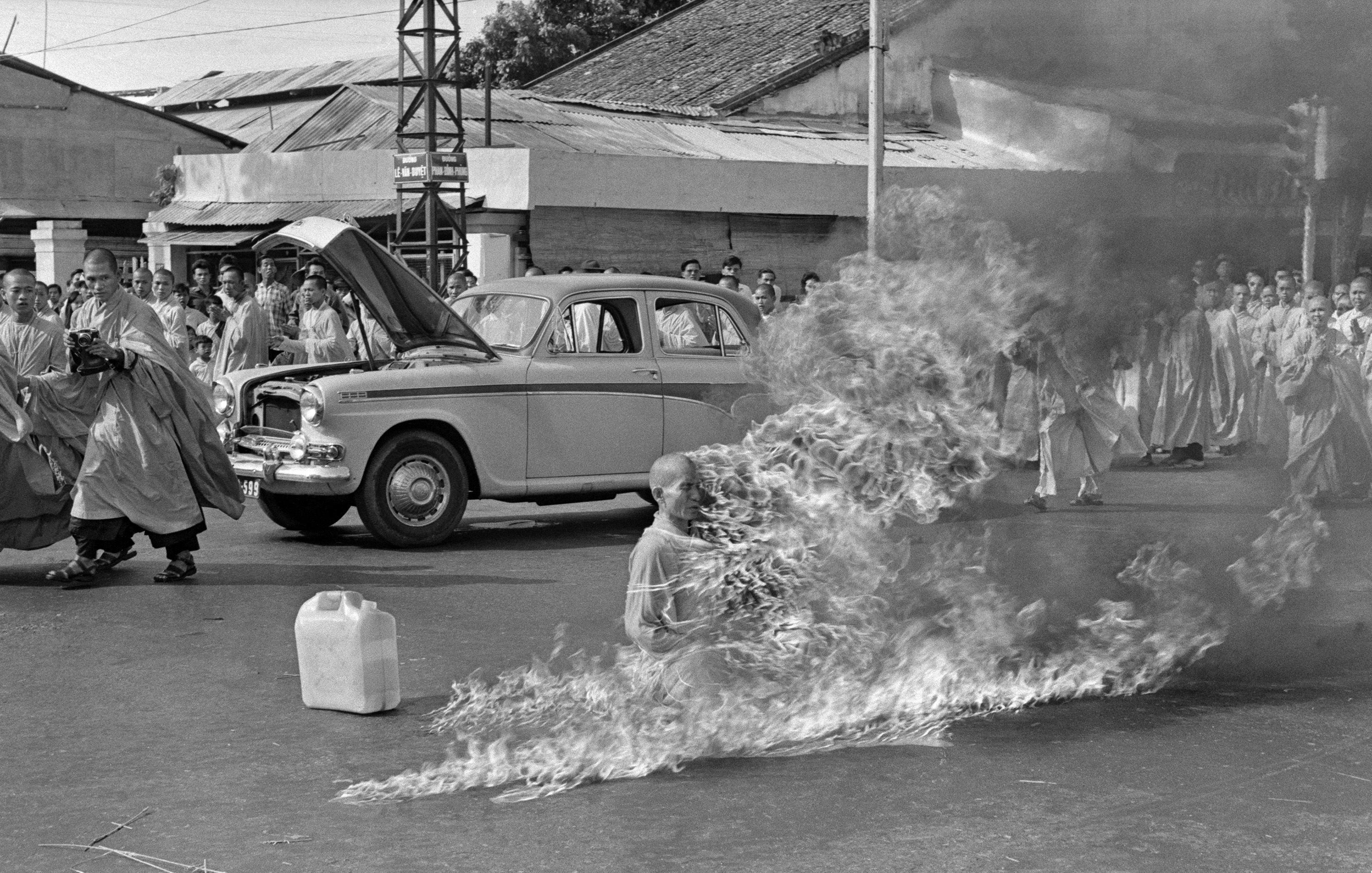
Self-immolation of Buddhist monk Thích Quảng Đức, 11 June 1963

After the Battle of Ap Bac, a debate began in the Kennedy cabinet about the viability of the Diệm regime, which was reinforced by the Buddhist crisis, which began in May 1963 as a campaign of civil resistance following a series of repressive acts by the South Vietnamese government. When talk of supporting a coup against Diệm was first raised by Kennedy at a National Security Council meeting in August 1963, McNamara spoke in favor of retaining Diệm. On 31 August 1963, Paul Kattenburg, a newly returned diplomat from Saigon suggested at a meeting attend by Rusk, McNamara and Vice President Johnson that the United States should end support for Diệm and leave South Vietnam to its fate. McNamara was stoutly opposed to Kattenburg's suggestion, saying "we have been winning the war".

==== First 1963 fact-finding mission ====
The Kennedy administration was unable to gain a consensus about what to do. In early September 1963 McNamara recommended Marine Major General Victor Krulak be sent on a four-day fact-finding mission; State Department official Joseph Mendenhall was also assigned to the trip. Upon returning their divergent reports (Krulak stated the war was being won, Mendenhall strongly disagreed) led President Kennedy to ask them "You two did visit the same country, didn't you?" USAID official Rufus Phillips walked away from this and subsequent meetings thinking that only President Kennedy seemed to show any interest in learning about Vietnam, and that all the other principals including McNamara were motivated only by pride and bureaucratic loyalty. McNamara would change Phillips' report of 60 Strategic Hamlets overrun to 60% and then claim it was untrue.

Kennedy two weeks later sent McNamara and General Taylor on a ten-day fact-finding mission to South Vietnam. At a meeting in the Gia Long Palace, President Diệm showed McNamara various graphs and charts that purported to be proof that the war was being won. This performance convinced McNamara the war was as good as won. Kennedy wanted a negative assessment of Diệm to justify supporting a coup, but McNamara and Taylor instead wrote about the "great progress" achieved by Diệm and confidently predicted that the "bulk" of the American advisers would leave in 1965 as by that point they predicted that the VC insurgency would be crushed. McNamara predicted that if Diệm continued his policies, that by 1965 the insurgency would be "little more than organized banditry".

Major General Lansdale had been Diệm's original American mentor. According to Daniel Ellsberg, he was ordered in late September or early October 1963 to McNamara's office. The two went to McNamara's limo and drove to the White House and met with President Kennedy. Kennedy wanted to send him to Vietnam due to his ability to reason with Diệm, but he wanted to know if Lansdale would support removing Diệm from office if it became necessary. Lansdale said no, that Diệm was his friend (Lansdale also believed that replacing Diệm would lead to disaster). Kennedy seemed to understand and didn't show any disappointment, but in the limo McNamara was furious: “You don’t talk to the president of the United States that way. When he asks you to do something, you don’t tell him you won’t do it.” (Note: Max Boot wrote that Ellsberg, a known tall tale teller, is the only source of this story concerning McNamara and Gen. Lansdale, and the White House visitor log has no record of this meeting, though it is consistent with the other events of this time.) Lansdale was ordered to retire from the Air Force by the end of October. During Lansdale's 31 October retirement reception McNamara walked through the room and never looked at Lansdale.

With the CIA and the ambassador Henry Cabot Lodge Jr. urging support for a coup while the Pentagon was opposed, Kennedy vacillated but ultimately gave the power of decision to Lodge. Lodge, who detested Diệm, gave his approval to the generals plotting against him. McNamara continued to oppose the coup; as late as a 25 October meeting with Kennedy he spoke against Lodge's use of Lucien Conein to liaise with the ARVN generals. Conein was a Franco-American military and CIA officer with extensive experience in Vietnam, but McNamara dismissed them with “We’re dealing through a press-minded ambassador and an unstable Frenchman – five times divorced…This is what we have to stop.” (Note: McNamara misrepresented Lucien Conein’s unwavering allegiance to the U.S. and his marital history: he had been divorced four times, not five, his last marriage would last 40 years.)

==== Coups and second 1963 fact-finding mission ====
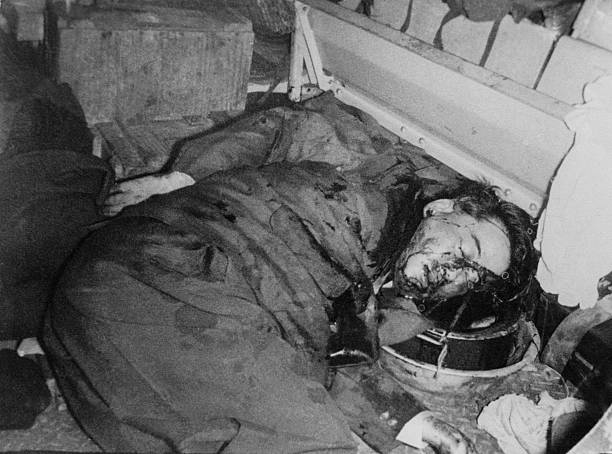
Body of Ngô Đình Diệm in the back of the M-113 APC, 2 November 1963

On 1 November 1963, the coup was launched. After the presidential palace was overrun in the fighting, Diệm was captured trying to flee Saigon and executed on 2 November 1963. The new government in Saigon was headed by General Dương Văn Minh. On 22 November 1963, Kennedy was assassinated and succeeded by Lyndon Johnson. Johnson had a profoundly insecure personality and heavily relied on McNamara's fealty and self-confidence.

In December 1963, Johnson sent McNamara on another "fact-finding mission" to South Vietnam to assess Minh's performance. On 19 December 1963, McNamara reported the situation was "very disturbing" as the "current trends, unless reversed in the next two or three months, will lead to neutralization at best or more likely to a Communist-controlled state". He also admitted that the computer models and statistics to which he had attached great importance were "grossly in error" and that government control of rural areas had "in fact been deteriorating...to a far greater extent than we realized" since July. The next day McNamara met with Generals Minh, Trần Văn Đôn, and Lê Văn Kim and arrogantly interrogated them; Kim, a veteran of the successful 1954-1956 civic action campaigns, later would say they "bit their tongues in rage". Regarding Minh's regime McNamara wrote at present "there is no organized government in South Vietnam". Though McNamara admitted that the new regime was "indecisive and drifting", he advised Johnson to undertake "more forceful moves if the situation does not show early signs of improvement".

On 30 January 1964, Minh was overthrown in a coup d'état by General Nguyễn Khánh but the change in leadership did not affect the war. Lyman Kirkpatrick of the CIA reported in February 1964 after visiting Saigon that he was "shocked by the number of our people and of the military, even those whose job is always to say we are winning, who feel the tide is against us". In a battle that same month which underscored problems in the ARVN, a VC battalion in the Mekong Delta escaped from a larger force of South Vietnamese troops which had been rated as some of the very best in the ARVN by the American advisers who had trained them.

==== First 1964 fact-finding mission ====
On 8 March 1964, McNamara visited South Vietnam to report to President Johnson about how well the new regime of Nguyễn Khánh was handling the war. Upon landing in Saigon, McNamara told the press: "We shall stay for as long it takes to ...win the battle against the Communist insurgents". During his visit, McNamara spoke memorized phrases in mangled Vietnamese (McNamara kept forgetting that Vietnamese is a tonal language) in speeches praising Khánh as South Vietnam's "best possible leader". McNamara always ended his speeches by shouting out what he thought was a phrase meaning "Long live a free Vietnam!", but as he used the wrong tones, instead he said "Vietnam, go to sleep!" At Johnson's insistence McNamara was photographed holding up Khánh's arm like a prizefighter, an image that was widely seen by Vietnamese of all political backgrounds as proving Khánh was an illegitimate American puppet. McNamara pressed Khánh to put South Vietnam on a war footing by conscripting all able-bodied young men into the military, which he promised he would do. However, Khánh did not keep his promise as wealthy and middle class South Vietnamese families objected to having their sons conscripted. As a result, the burden of conscription fell onto the sons of poor families, provoking much resentment.

After returning to Washington on 13 March, McNamara reported to Johnson that the situation had "unquestionably been growing worse": since his last visit in December 1963 with 40% of the countryside now under "Vietcong control or predominant influence", most of the South Vietnamese people were displaying "apathy and indifference", the desertion rate in the ARVN was "high and increasing" while the VC were "recruiting energetically". The "greatest weakness" accordingly to McNamara was the "uncertain viability" of Khánh's government, which could have been overthrown at any moment as the ARVN was ridden with factionalism.

To save South Vietnam, McNamara recommended that the United States make it "emphatically clear" its willingness to support Khánh to the hilt. Other recommendations, which were accepted in a National Security Council (NSC) action memorandum, called for the United States to pay for an increase in the ARVN, provide the Republic of Vietnam Air Force with more planes and helicopters, and for the United States to pay for more civil servants to administer rural South Vietnam. More importantly, the NSC memorandum redefined the Vietnam War as not only important for Asia, but for the entire world as the document asserted the global credibility of the United States was now at stake as it was claimed America's allies would lose faith in American promises if the South Vietnamese government were overthrown. The NSC memorandum argued that to "lose" South Vietnam would fatally weaken American global leadership, making the war a "test case" of American willingness to continue as a global power.

==== Sidelining of the Joint Chiefs of Staff ====
McNamara had begun recommending "graduated pressure" strategies in the spring of 1964 after their apparent success during the Cuban Missile Crisis; Lyndon Johnson was attracted to this approach due to his desire to avoid the appearance of warmongering. McNamara did not want the Joint Chiefs of Staff to make any recommendations on Vietnam that conflicted with his, so he used interservice rivalries to prevent them from developing a consensus. In March 1964 he said “Divide and conquer is a pretty good rule in this situation. And to be quite frank, I’ve tried to do that in the last couple of weeks and it’s coming along pretty well...” He also worked with General Maxwell Taylor, the Chairman of the Joint Chiefs, to prevent their views from reaching the president. H.R. McMaster would write:

The Chiefs desperately needed a leader to bring them together. Only the chairman could overcome their profound preoccupation with service interests. But Taylor, anxious to keep competing advice from the president, resolved to use the Chiefs’ divisions to keep the policy-making initiative with McNamara and himself. Unable to work together in a productive manner, and with their advice silenced by the secretary of defense and the chairman, the Chiefs did not challenge McNamara’s strategic concept for American military involvement in Vietnam...If the Chiefs had successfully pressed with the president their position that the United States needed to act forcefully to defeat the North, they might have forced a difficult choice between [full-scale non-graduated] war and withdrawal from South Vietnam. Through their own [parochial] actions as well as through the manipulation of Taylor and McNamara, the Chiefs missed their opportunity to influence the formulation of a strategic concept for Vietnam, and thereafter always found themselves in the difficult position of questioning a policy that the president had already approved. The intellectual foundation for deepening American involvement in Vietnam had been laid without the participation of the Joint Chiefs of Staff...the assumptions [largely created by McNamara] that underlay the president’s policy went unchallenged by the one formal body charged by law and tradition with advising the president of the United States about strategy and warfare.

The Chiefs came to see McNamara's infrequent meetings with them, meetings in which no problems were discussed, as "cosmetic" to prevent criticism that he never met with them.

==== Sigma war games ====
A war game called Sigma I–64 was conducted during 6–9 April 1964 by top civilian and military officials. They concluded that a bombing campaign would not stop and most likely would accelerate North Vietnamese infiltration into the South. McNamara rejected this conclusion on the grounds it was not adequately quantified. A second game in 8–17 September 1964, Sigma II–64, would come to the same conclusion and would also be ignored.

==== Second 1964 fact-finding mission ====
Ambassador Lodge in early May 1964 began to push for a widening of military action. President Johnson wanted to avoid any such increase prior to the 1964 elections and the passage of his Great Society legislation, so he sent McNamara back to Saigon to contain such recommendations. McNamara told MACV officers to base their requests on quantitative data so he could properly consider them.

MACV commander General Paul D. Harkins returned to the U.S. on June 20, 1964. McNamara refused to consult with him about his experiences in Vietnam. He was succeeded by his deputy commander, General William Westmoreland.

==== U.S. aid implications ====
Although South Vietnam by 1964 was receiving a sum of American economic and military aid that ran to $2 million per day, the South Vietnamese state was falling apart. Corruption reached such a point that most South Vietnamese civil servants and soldiers were not being paid while the projects for "rural pacification" that the United States had paid for had collapsed as the money had instead been stolen. The advice that McNamara and other American officials gave to the South Vietnamese to make reforms to crack down on corruption and make the government more effective was always ignored as by this point the South Vietnamese government knew very well that the Americans, having repeatedly promised in public that they would never permit the "loss" of South Vietnam, were now prisoners of their own rhetoric. The threats to withhold aid were bluffs, which the South Vietnamese exposed by simply ignoring the American advice, leading to a situation whereby Stanley Karnow, the Vietnam correspondent for Time noted:"...America lacked leverage...For the South Vietnamese knew that the United States could not abandon them without damaging its own prestige. So despite their reliance on American aid, now more than a half-billion dollars a year, they could safely defy American dictates. In short, their weakness was their strength". One South Vietnamese minister told Karnow at the time: "Our big advantage over the Americans is that they want to win the war more than we do".

==== Congress ====
In April 1964, Senator Wayne Morse called the war "McNamara's War". In response, McNamara told the press that he was honored, saying "I think it is a very important war, and I am pleased to be identified with it and do whatever I can to win it". In May 1964, Senator Richard Russell advised Johnson against relying too much on McNamara, saying "McNamara is the smartest fella any of us know. But he's got too much-he's opinionated as hell-and he's made up his mind". Russell told Johnson that he should find an expert, preferably a World War II general who was "not scared to death of McNamara" to go to South Vietnam to say that the war was unwinnable and that the United States should pull out, but Johnson rejected the advice. (Note: See Matthew Ridgway § Operation Vulture for the likely candidate of a WW2 general who would have stopped the escalation.)

To compensate for the weaknesses of the South Vietnamese state, by late winter of 1964, senior officials in the Johnson administration such as McNamara's deputy, William Bundy, the assistant secretary of defense, were advocating American intervention in the war. Such intervention presented a constitutional problem: to intervene on the scale envisioned would mean waging war, and only Congress had the legal power to declare war. The solution was floated for Congress to pass a resolution granting Johnson the power to wage war in Vietnam in spite of his opposition to mooted plans to declare war on North Vietnam.

==== Gulf of Tonkin incident ====
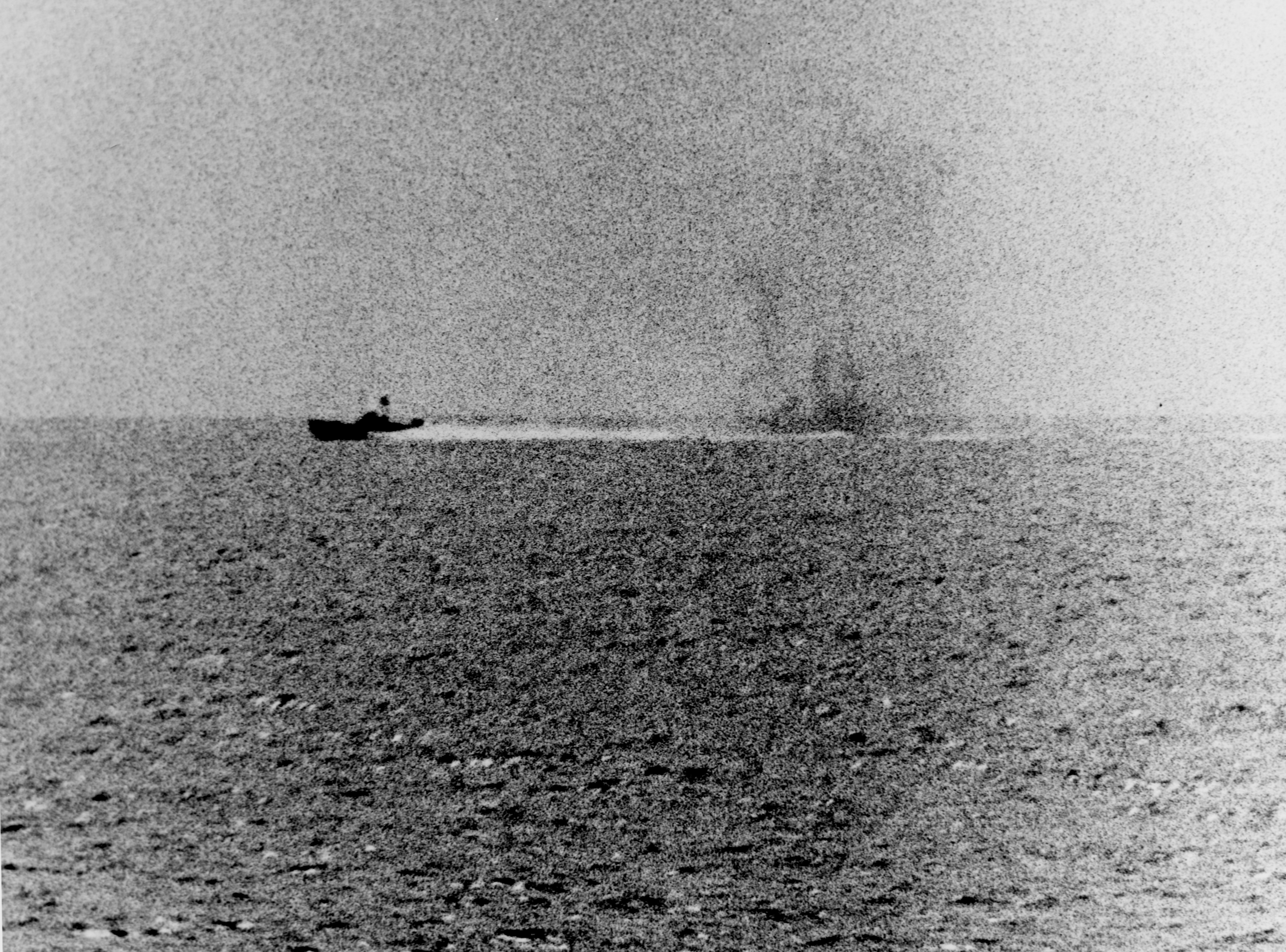
A North Vietnamese P-4 torpedo boat engaging USS Maddox, 2 August 1964

By 1964, the U.S. Navy sent destroyers into the Gulf of Tonkin to gather intelligence and to support raids by South Vietnamese commandos on North Vietnam. On 2 August 1964, one destroyer, the USS Maddox was involved in a naval skirmish with three North Vietnamese Vietnam People's Navy torpedo boats. On 4 August 1964, the Maddox and another destroyer, the USS Turner Joy, initially reported they were attacked by the North Vietnamese torpedo boats in international waters on a stormy night, but shortly afterward reported there was probably no attack. Captain John J. Herrick of the Maddox reported that the "torpedo boats" were almost certainly just radar "blips" caused by the "freak weather effects" of the storm and the reports of an attack on his ship were due to an "overeager" sonar operator who mistook the motors of the ship for the rush of torpedoes. Johnson promptly seized upon the reports of an attack on a Navy warship in international waters to ask Congress to pass a resolution giving him the authority to wage war in Vietnam. McNamara, via Admiral U. S. Grant Sharp Jr. of the Pacific fleet, put strong pressure on Herrick to say that his ship had been attacked by torpedo boats, despite Herrick's reservations.

On 5 August 1964, McNamara appeared before Congress to present proof of what he claimed was an attack on the Navy's warships in international waters off the Gulf of Tonkin and stated it was imperative that Congress pass the resolution as quickly as possible. Records from the Lyndon Johnson Library show McNamara may have misled Johnson on the purported attack on the Maddox by withholding recommendations from Admiral Sharp against executing airstrikes until the facts were better known. McNamara was also instrumental in presenting the event to Congress and the public as justification for escalation of the war against the communists.

(Decades later after the fact in 1995, McNamara met with former North Vietnam Defense Minister Võ Nguyên Giáp, who told his American counterpart that the August 4 attack never happened, a conclusion McNamara eventually came to accept.)

Congress approved the resolution on 10 August 1964, with only Senators Wayne Morse (D-OR), and Ernest Gruening (D-AK), voting against, Concurrent with his efforts to pass the resolution, President Johnson had ordered Operation Pierce Arrow, retaliatory air strikes on North Vietnamese naval bases. The Gulf of Tonkin Resolution authorized the president "to take all necessary measures to repel any armed attack against the forces of the U.S. and to prevent further aggression" but the larger issue turned out to be the sweeping powers granted by the resolution. It gave Johnson virtually unfettered authority to expand retaliation for a relatively minor naval incident into a major land war involving 500,000 American soldiers. "The fundamental issue of Tonkin Gulf involved not deception but, rather, misuse of power bestowed by the resolution," McNamara wrote later. Though Johnson now had the authority to wage war, he proved reluctant to use it, for example by rejecting the advice of the Joint Chiefs of Staff to bomb North Vietnam after a 1 November 1964 VC attack on Bien Hoa Air Base killed five Americans and destroyed 5 B-57 bombers.

==== Escalation ====
McNamara insisted that applications of U.S. military power be designed to influence the thinking of the North Vietnamese leadership. Lieutenant General Andrew Goodpaster told him in the fall of 1964, “Sir, you are trying to program the enemy and that is one thing we must never try to do. We can’t do his thinking for him.” Goodpaster's warning fell on deaf ears.

On 1 December 1964 McNamara again recommended a graduated response program, by urging Johnson to launch Operation Barrel Roll, a bombing offensive against North Vietnamese supply lines along the Ho Chi Minh trail in the southern part of Laos; this was approved by the president. On Christmas Eve 1964, the VC bombed the Brinks Hotel in Saigon, killing two Americans. Despite McNamara's recommendations to bomb North Vietnam, Johnson still hesitated.

In 1965, in response to increased military activity in South Vietnam by VC insurgents and North Vietnamese regular forces, the U.S. began bombing North Vietnam, deployed large military forces and entered into combat in South Vietnam. McNamara's plan, supported by requests from top U.S. military commanders in Vietnam, led to the commitment of 485,000 troops by the end of 1967 and almost 535,000 by 30 June 1968. In January 1965, McNamara together with the National Security Adviser McGeorge Bundy co-wrote a memo to President Johnson stating, "both of us are now pretty well convinced that our present policy can lead only to disastrous defeat" as it was hopeless to expect the unstable and corrupt South Vietnamese government to defeat the VC who were steadily "gaining in the countryside". Bundy and McNamara wrote "the time for has come for hard choices" as the United States now had the alternatives of either negotiating with North Vietnam to "salvage what little can be preserved" or to resort to intervention to "force a change". Both Bundy and McNamara stated that they favored the latter, arguing that the commitment of U.S. troops to fight in South Vietnam and a strategic bombing campaign against North Vietnam were now required. McNamara's hawkish stance on Vietnam was well known in Washington and many in the press often referred to the war as "McNamara's war" as he was the one in the cabinet always pressing for greater American involvement.

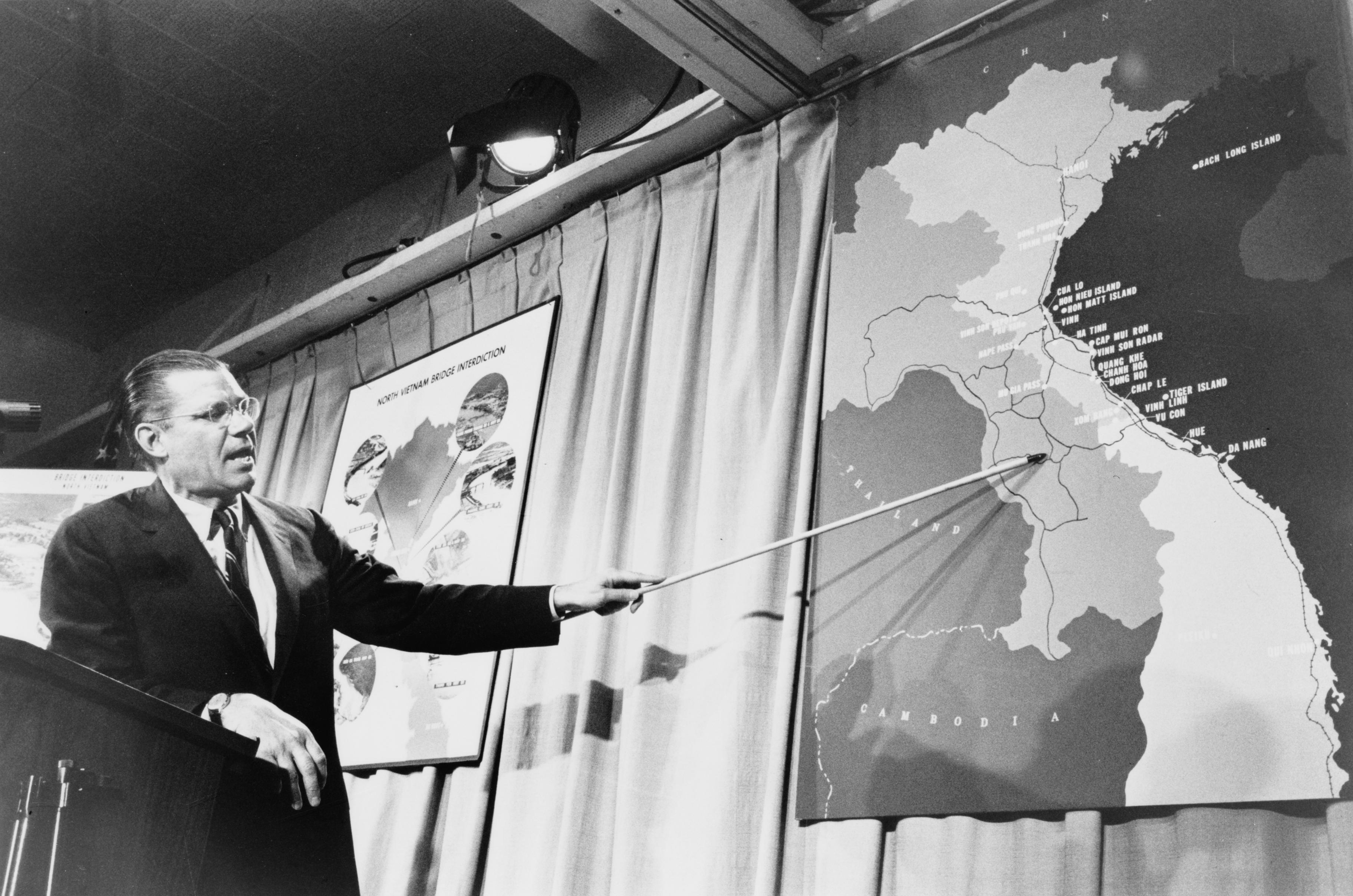
McNamara pointing to a map of Vietnam at a press conference on 26 April 1965

On 7 February 1965, the VC attacked the American airfield at Pleiku, killing 8 Americans and destroying 10 aircraft. After hearing of the attack, Johnson assembled his national security team together with the Speaker of the House of Representatives, John W. McCormack, and the Senate Majority Leader, Mike Mansfield, to announce "I've had enough of this". Only Mansfield and the Vice President, Hubert Humphrey, objected to Johnson's plans to bomb North Vietnam. Aircraft from the carrier, USS Ranger, launched Operation Flaming Dart bombing the North Vietnamese army base at Đồng Hới later that day. McNamara was forced to tell Johnson that the Flaming Dart raids had done little damage owing to the heavy clouds, which caused the pilots to miss when dropping their bombs, and more raids would be needed. On 11 February, Johnson ordered more bombing raids, and on 2 March approved Operation Rolling Thunder, a strategic bombing offensive against North Vietnam that was originally planned to last eight weeks, but instead went on for three years. After the bombing raids started, General Westmoreland cabled Johnson to say that Da Nang Air Base was vulnerable as he had no faith in the ability of the South Vietnamese to protect it, leading him to ask for American troops to be deployed instead. On 8 March 1965, two battalions from the United States Marine Corps landed at Da Nang, making the beginning of the ground war for the United States. On 20 April, McNamara urged Johnson to send 40,000 troops to Vietnam, advice that was accepted.

==== 1965 fact-finding mission ====
By June 1965, Westmoreland reported that South Vietnam was faced with a "collapse", which would require 280,000 troops to stop and reverse the momentum. McNamara's advice in July 1965 to Johnson was to commit 180,000 more troops to South Vietnam in addition to a stepped up aerial offensive to destroy North Vietnam's economy was called by McGeorge Bundy "rash to the point of folly". Bundy stated that for Johnson to agree to McNamara's advice "was a slippery slope toward total U.S. responsibility and corresponding fecklessness on the Vietnamese side". Bundy argued that it was the responsibility of the South Vietnamese government to stop the VC and that if the Americans continued to do all the fighting, then the United States would lack the necessary leverage to pressure Saigon into making reforms, turning "...the conflict into a white man's war, with the United States in the shoes of the French".

To resolve the debate, McNamara visited South Vietnam later in July on yet another "fact-finding mission" for Johnson, though before he departed Assistant Secretary of Defense for International Security Affairs John McNaughton had already drafted the report that McNamara would send to the president on his return. McNaughton's deputy, Adam Yarmolinsky, later described McNamara's trip as “theater” designed to justify decisions already made. He met the new South Vietnamese Premier, Air Marshal Nguyễn Cao Kỳ, who had just overthrown Khánh. Kỳ wore a flamboyant uniform which he had designed himself of a white jacket, black pants, red socks and black shoes which led McNamara to dub him as looking "like a saxophone player in a second-rate nightclub". McNamara was not impressed with Kỳ, reporting to Johnson that he saw little evidence that he was capable of winning the war, and the United States would have to send more troops to South Vietnam. Upon his return to the United States, McNamara told the press that the U.S. forces in Vietnam were inflicting "increasingly heavy losses" on the VC, but in private told Johnson that the situation was "worse than a year ago".

==== Norman Morrison suicide ====
On 2 November 1965, Quaker antiwar activist Norman Morrison died after self-immolation with kerosene under McNamara's window at the Pentagon. All McNamara saw from his office was the smoke rising from the parking lot, but he was sufficiently troubled by the incident that he refused to discuss it with his family, all the more so because his wife Margey was opposed to the war and sympathized with Morrison's feelings, if not his suicide. McNamara later said in the 2003 documentary The Fog of War, "[Morrison] came to the Pentagon, doused himself with gasoline. Burned himself to death below my office ... his wife issued a very moving statement – 'human beings must stop killing other human beings' – and that's a belief that I shared, I shared it then, I believe it even more strongly today". McNamara then posited, "How much evil must we do in order to do good? We have certain ideals, certain responsibilities. Recognize that at times you will have to engage in evil, but minimize it."

==== Costs ====
Though McNamara warned the president in July 1965 that the war would cost an extra $10 billion in defense spending over the next year, Johnson at a press conference said his administration would be spending only an extra $300–400 million until January 1966. McNamara warned that the increased spending would spark inflation and raise the deficit, advising Johnson to ask Congress to increase taxes to forestall those eventualities. Johnson responded by saying that Congress would not vote for higher taxes, leading McNamara to argue that the president should at least try, saying "I would rather fight for what's right and fail than not try". Johnson snapped: "Goddammit, Bob, that's what's wrong with you-you aren't a politician".

==== Body counts ====
On 7 November 1965, McNamara sent Johnson a memo saying that the "substantial loss of American lives" in Vietnam was worth the sacrifice in order to contain China, which McNamara called the world's most dangerous nation. McNamara wrote that the deployment of troops to South Vietnam would "make sense only if they are in support of a long-term United States policy to contain China", writing that the process of "containing" China would require "American attention, money and, from time to time unfortunately lives".

The casualty lists mounted as the number of troops and the intensity of fighting escalated. McNamara put in place a statistics-based strategy for victory in Vietnam. He concluded that there was a limited number of VC fighters in South Vietnam and that a war of attrition would be sufficient to destroy them. He applied metrics (body counts) to determine how close to success his plan was. Faced with a guerrilla war, the question of holding territory was irrelevant as the VC never operated for extended periods in areas where the Americans were strong and if the Americans occupied an area in force, the VC simply moved to other areas where the American presence was weaker. Westmoreland had decided, with the support of McNamara, to defend all of South Vietnam, believing that he could win via a strategy of attrition as he would simply inflict enough losses to end the enemy's ability to wage war. McNamara devised the "body count" measurement to determine how well the Americans were doing, reasoning if the Americans were inflicting heavy losses as measured by the "body count", it must be a sign that they were winning.

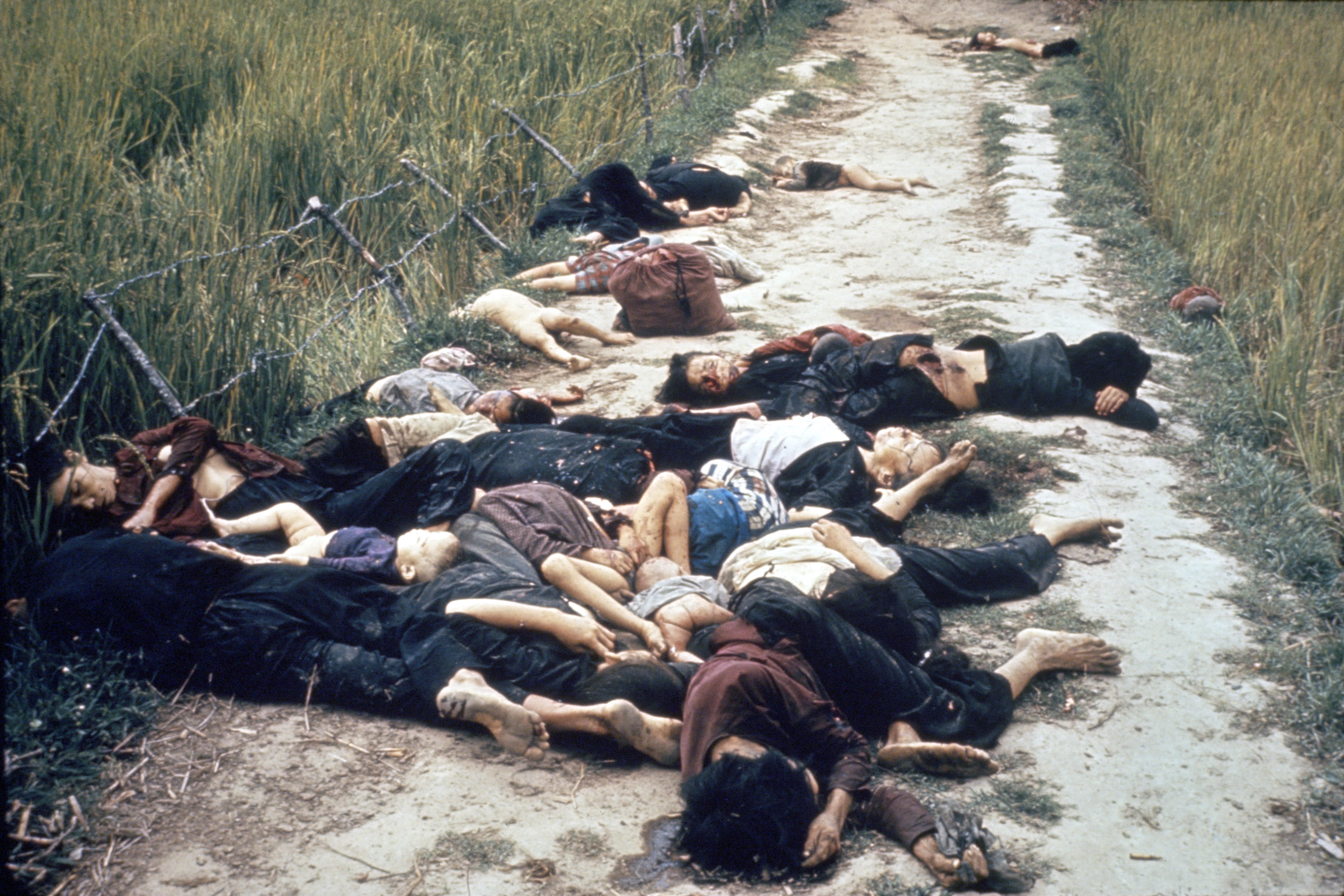
My Lai massacre 1968

General William Peers (the leader of the investigation into the Mỹ Lai massacre, which occurred 2 weeks after McNamara left office) wrote critically of the "body count" strategy, stating: "...with improper leadership, 'body count' could create competition between units, particularly if these statistics were compared like baseball standings and there were no stringent requirements as to how and by whom the counts were to be made". The obsession with "body counts" led to much exaggeration of the losses inflicted on the enemy as the officers with the highest "body counts" were promoted while also fueling a grisly competition between units to achieve the highest "body counts" that led to innocent civilians being killed to inflate their daily "body counts". It is generally accepted by historians that the vast daily losses that U.S. officers claimed to have inflicted on the VC were fabricated as many officers desperate for a promotion reported "body counts" well above what they were actually achieving.

==== Army opposition to counterinsurgency in Vietnam ====
The U.S. Army sabotaged the efforts of Kennedy and McNamara to develop a more counterinsurgency role by simply declaring that the Army's basic unit, the division, was flexible enough to engage against guerrillas while also promising that the traditional fondness for using maximum firepower would not present a problem as firepower use would be "discriminating". In Vietnam, this led to divisions, whose size limited them and their supply trains to the road, using massive amounts of firepower against guerrillas who were often "nimble" enough to evade all of the firepower brought to bear. Instead, the standard tactics of bringing massive firepower to bear in the form of napalm and artillery strikes against the guerrillas often killed civilians, fueling support for the VC. The Special Forces did fight in Vietnam, but only as an adjutant to the traditional infantry and armored divisions, which did most of the fighting. In a 1966 memo, McNamara admitted that the sort of counterinsurgency war envisioned by Kennedy with the Special Forces leading the fight had not occurred and wrote that the responsibility for this "undoubtedly lies with bad management" on the part of the Army.

==== Disenchantment ====
In November 1965, McNamara, who had been a supporter of the war, first started to have doubts about the war, saying at a press conference that "it will be a long war", which completely contradicted his previous optimistic statements that the war would be brought to a close soon. Although he was a prime architect of the Vietnam War and repeatedly overruled the JCS on strategic matters, McNamara gradually became skeptical about whether the war could be won by deploying more troops to South Vietnam and intensifying the bombing of North Vietnam, a claim he published in a book years later. He also stated later that his support of the war was given out of loyalty to administration policy. He traveled to South Vietnam many times to study the situation firsthand and became increasingly reluctant to approve the large force increments requested by the military commanders.

As a Christmas gesture, Johnson ordered a bombing pause over North Vietnam and went off to his ranch in Texas for the holidays. McNamara went with his family for skiing in Colorado, but upon hearing that the president was open to extending the bombing pause for a few more days, he left his family at the sky lodge in the Rockies to fly to the Johnson ranch on 27 December 1965. McNamara knew that Johnson tended to listen to the advice of Rusk who saw extending the bombing pause as weakness and wanted a meeting with Johnson without Rusk present. McNamara argued to the president in a three hour long meeting that the North Vietnamese would not open peace talks unless the bombing were stopped first, as they kept saying repeatedly, and persuaded Johnson to extend the bombing pause into January. At a New Year's Eve party attended by Washington's elite to welcome 1966, McNamara expressed doubts about America's ability to win the war. A week later at a dinner party attended by the economist John Kenneth Galbraith and Johnson's speechwriter Dick Goodwin, McNamara stated that victory was unobtainable, and the best that could be achieved was an "honorable withdrawal" that might save South Vietnam as a state.

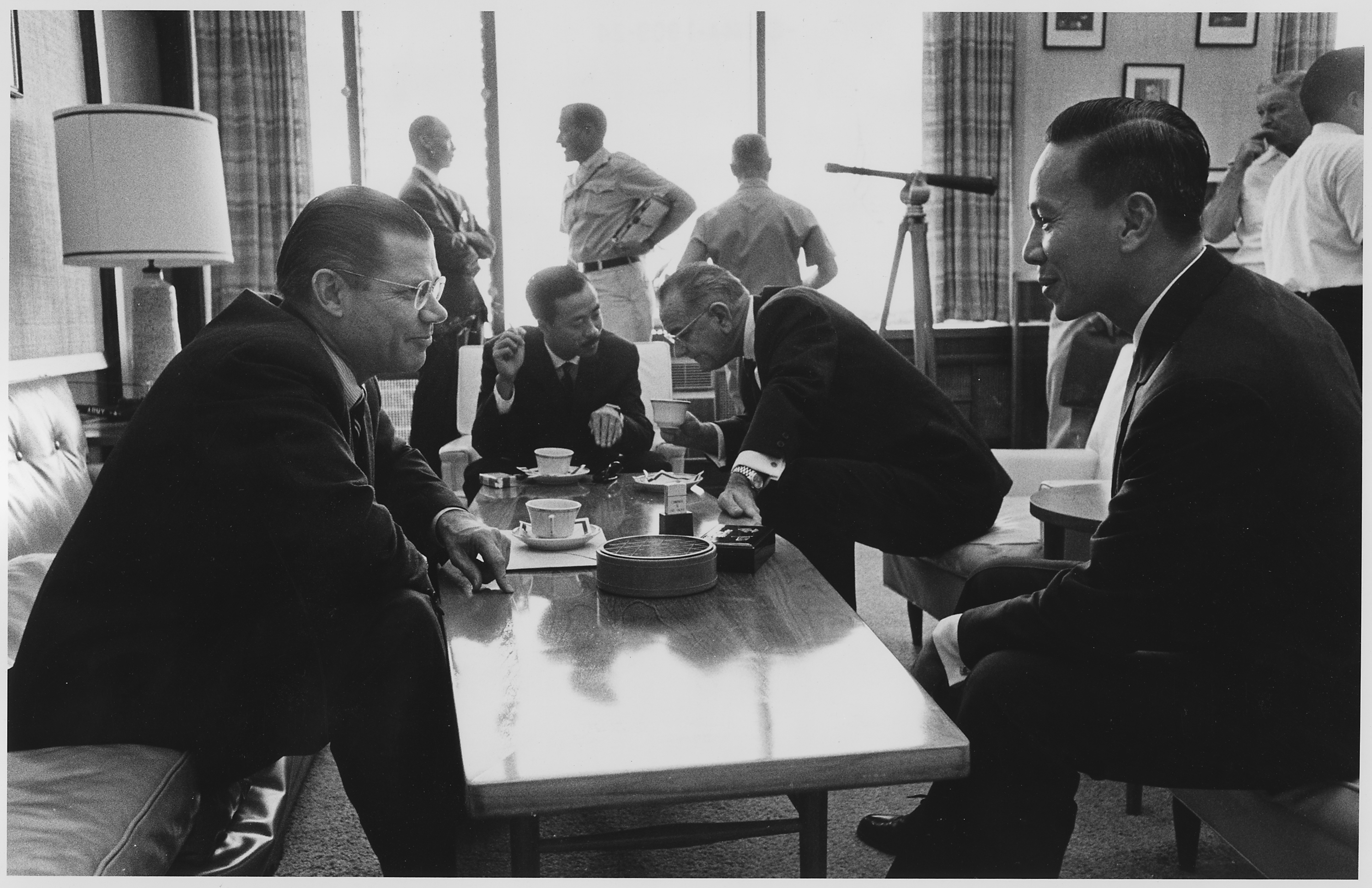
McNamara, South Vietnamese President Nguyễn Văn Thiệu, President Johnson, and South Vietnamese PM Nguyễn Cao Kỳ in Honolulu in February 1966

In February 1966, during the Honolulu conference, McNamara during an "off-the-record" chat with a group of journalists spoke about the war in very jaded terms, stating frankly that Operation Rolling Thunder was a failure. McNamara stated that North Vietnam was a backward Third World country that did not have the same advanced industrial infrastructure of First World nations, making the bombing offensive useless. McNamara concluded: "No amount of bombing can end the war". Karnow, one of the journalists present during the "off-the-record" conversation, described McNamara's personality as having changed, noting the Defense Secretary, who was normally so arrogant and self-assured, convinced he could "scientifically" solve any problem, as being subdued and clearly less self-confident.

On 18 May 1966, McNamara gave a speech in Montreal before the American Society of Newspaper Editors entitled Security in the Contemporary World, in which he criticized many aspects of U.S. defense policy. He later said “I gave the Montreal speech because I could not survive in office without giving it, could not survive with my own conscience, and it gave me another ten months, but the price I paid for it is so high in the Congress and the White House, people who have assumed I was a peacenik all along, that if I had to do it over again, I would not give that speech.” (Note: Lyndon Johnson was reportedly furious with McNamara's Montreal speech, and the discovery that White House aide Bill Moyers had cleared it was a factor in Moyer's early departure.)

==== Reserve mobilization proposal ====
McNamara also advised the president that by early 1966 he would have to send 100,000 more troops to South Vietnam in order to win the war, and he would need to mobilize the Reserves and state National Guards as well. Johnson accepted the first recommendation while rejecting the latter, disregarding Bundy's warnings that sending more troops would paradoxically mean holding less leverage over South Vietnam. To mobilize the Reserves and National Guards would mean having to call up hundreds of thousands of men from civilian life, which would inevitably disrupt the economy and put it on a war footing. Johnson rejected the scenario as it would impose too many sacrifices on ordinary Americans while threatening his chances for reelection.

Because the Reserves were never called up, the Army had to send much of its manpower to Vietnam, leaving the divisions in Western Europe in a "skeletal" condition. To make up for the shortfall, the Army had to rely upon the draft, which caused much domestic opposition, especially as the draft system offered generous exemptions for those attending university and college and lead to the burden of the fighting to fall disproportionately upon men from poorer families. Because of the refusal to call up the Reserves, McNamara had to increase the draft call in July 1965 from 17,000 per month to 35,000 per month. As most of the 18 and 19-year-old draftees had a high school diploma or less, this also led to a decline in the Army's intellectual standards, with many officers complaining that most of the draftees were not intelligent enough to be trained for technical duties or promoted up the ranks. Throughout the war, the chairman of the Joint Chiefs of Staff, General Earle Wheeler, pressed very strongly for the reserves and national guards to be called out, saying the war was steadily ruining the Army.

==== McNamara Line ====
After long study, in September 1966 McNamara ordered the construction of a barrier line to detect the infiltration of North Vietnamese forces into southern Laos, South Vietnam, and Cambodia that would help direct air strikes. Physically, the McNamara Line ran across South Vietnam to the Laotian border along the Vietnamese Demilitarized Zone (DMZ). The Vietnam barrier and its Laotian extension also used innovative air-dropped sensors under Operation Igloo White. Igloo White cost between $1 and $1.7 billion to design and build, and an additional billion dollars per year to operate over the five-year life of the operation; controversy has surrounded accounts of its effectiveness.

==== 1966 fact-finding mission ====
In October 1966, McNamara returned from yet another visit to South Vietnam, full of confidence in public and doubt in private. McNamara told the media that "process has exceeded our expectations" while telling the president he saw "no reasonable way to bring the war to an end soon". Though McNamara reported to Johnson that American forces were inflicting heavy losses on the North Vietnamese and VC, he added that they could "more than replace" their losses and that "full security exists nowhere" in South Vietnam, even in areas supposedly "pacified" by the Americans. Worst of all, McNamara complained that the South Vietnamese were still not carrying their full share of the load, as they expected the Americans to do all the fighting for them, stating: "This important war must be fought and won by the Vietnamese themselves. We have known this from the beginning. But the discouraging truth is that, as was the case in 1961 and 1963 and 1965, we have not found the formula, the catalyst, for training and inspiring them into effective action".

==== Project 100,000 ====
In October 1966, he launched Project 100,000, the lowering of military Armed Forces Qualification Test standards, which allowed 354,000 additional men to be recruited, despite criticism that they were not suited to working in high-stress or dangerous environments. According to Hamilton Gregory, author of the book McNamara's Folly: The Use of Low-IQ Troops in the Vietnam War, inductees of the project died at three times the rate of other Americans serving in Vietnam and following their service had lower incomes and higher rates of divorce than their non-veteran counterparts.

==== Antiwar confrontation ====
In November 1966, McNamara visited Harvard University to see Henry Kissinger; his car was surrounded by anti-war protesters who forced the automobile to stop. The students refused to let the car move until McNamara debated their leader, Michael Ansara, the president of the Harvard chapter of Students for a Democratic Society. McNamara agreed to the debate, and standing on the hood of his car answered the charge from a student in the crowd that the United States was waging aggression by saying the war started in 1954, not 1957, which he knew "because the International Control Commission wrote a report that said so. You haven't read it, and if you have, you obviously didn't understand it". When the student answered that he had read the International Control Commission's report and it did not say that, McNamara responded he had been a far better university student than his opponent, saying "I was tougher than you then and I'm tougher today! I was more courteous then, and I hope I'm more courteous today!". As McNamara continued to insult the crowd and the mood grew uglier, he fled into Quincy House, from which he escaped via underground tunnels to see Kissinger. The confrontation with the students had shaken him, and it took half an hour before he was ready to address Kissinger's class.

==== Failures ====
Because the effects of Operation Rolling Thunder were more easily measured than with the ground war, McNamara was especially troubled by the revelation that the bombing offensive had not caused the collapse of North Vietnam's economy as predicted. In June 1967, American bombers hit North Vietnam's hydroelectric plants and reduced North Vietnam capacity to generate electricity by 85%, according to McNamara's calculations. At the same time, he also calculated that the annual amount of electricity generated in North Vietnam was equal only to a fifth of the electricity generated every year at the Potomac Electric Power Company's plant in Alexandria, Virginia, making the destruction of North Vietnamese power plants meaningless to the outcome of the war as the amount of electricity generated was so small. He also calculated in 1967 that over the last two years, American bombers had inflicted damage on North Vietnam equal to about $300 million while at the same time, Rolling Thunder had cost the U.S. Air Force about 700 aircraft shot down over North Vietnam whose total purchase value was about $900 million, (Note: The replacement costs of the downed U.S. aircraft was even greater than their purchase costs.) making the bombing campaign uneconomical.

McNamara's doubts were encouraged by his civilian aides such as Leslie H. Gelb and John McNaughton, who complained that their wives and teenage children were chiding them as "war criminals" when they came home from work. McNamara's own teenage son, Robert Craig McNamara, was opposed to the war and denounced his father when he came from work every day. McNamara was shocked to discover that the American flag was hanging upside down in his son's bedroom as the younger McNamara told him that he was ashamed of America because of him. McNaughton told McNamara that after having talked to some of the young people that "a feeling is widely and strongly held...that 'the Establishment' is out of its mind" and the dominant opinion was "that we are trying to impose some U.S. image on distant peoples we cannot understand and that we carrying the thing to absurd lengths."

In a memo of 19 May 1967 to the president, McNamara stated the military side of the war was going well with the Americans killing thousands of the enemy every month, but the political side was not, as South Vietnam remained as dysfunctional as ever. He wrote: "Corruption is widespread. Real government control is confined to enclaves. There is rot in the fabric". McNamara wrote that the idea that the American forces would temporarily stabilize the situation so the South Vietnamese could take over the war themselves was flawed as the dysfunctional South Vietnamese state would never be able to win the war, thus meaning the Americans would have to stay in Vietnam for decades to come. He advised Johnson not to accept Westmoreland's call for an additional 200,000 soldiers as that would mean calling up the Reserves, which in turn would require a wartime economy. The economic sacrifices that ending the peacetime economy would entail would make it almost politically impossible to negotiate peace, and in effect would mean placing the hawks in charge, which was why those of a hawkish inclination kept pressing for the Reserves to be called up. The economic sacrifices could only be justified to the American people by saying the war would be brought to a victorious conclusion. McNamara rejected the advice of the hawks, warning that steps such as bombing North Vietnam's dikes and locks to flood the farmland with the aim of causing a famine; mining the coast of North Vietnam to sink Soviet ships bringing in arms; invading Laos and Cambodia; and finally in the last resort using nuclear weapons if the other measures failed were likely to alienate world opinion and increase domestic opposition. McNamara wrote: "The picture of the world's greatest superpower killing or seriously injuring 1,000 noncombatants a week, while trying to pound a tiny backward nation into submission on an issue whose merits are hotly disputed, is not a pretty one".

Finally, McNamara dismissed the Domino Theory as irrelevant since General Suharto had seized power in Indonesia in 1965 and proceeded to wipe out the Indonesian Communist Party, the third-largest in the world, killing hundreds of thousands of Indonesian Communists. He argued that with Suharto in power in Indonesia, "the trend in Asia was now running in America's favor, which reduced the importance of South Vietnam". To the Americans, Indonesia was the most important of all the "dominoes" in Southeast Asia, and McNamara argued that even if the South Vietnamese "domino" were to fall, the Indonesian "domino" would still stand.

==== Nuclear weapons use proposal ====
On 21 January 1968, nine days before the Tet Offensive broke out, General William Westmoreland proposed planning for tactical nuclear weapons use in Vietnam; Air Force chief of staff General John McConnell concurred. McNamara sent a secret memorandum to Lyndon Johnson on 19 February 1968 – ten days before he left office – which discounted the nuclear option. McNamara wrote: "because of terrain and other conditions peculiar to our operations in South Vietnam, it is inconceivable that the use of nuclear weapons would be recommended there against either Viet Cong or North Vietnamese forces". In the same memo McNamara mentioned that he personally contacted scientists George Killian, George Kistiakowsky and I.I. Rabi to assure them nuclear weapons use was not considered; the three had telegraphed former President Eisenhower to elicit his support against such use.

==== Pentagon Papers origins ====
McNamara commissioned the Vietnam Study Task Force on 17 June 1967. He was inspired by the confrontation at Harvard the previous November as he had discovered that the students he had been debating knew more about Vietnam's history than he did. The task was assigned to Leslie Gelb and six officials whom McNamara instructed to examine just how and why the United States became involved in Vietnam, by answering his list of 100 questions starting with American relations with the Viet Minh in World War II. McNamara expected them to be done by September 1967; they finished by January 1969. Though Gelb was a hawk who had written pro-war speeches for the Republican Senator Jacob Javits, he and his team, which grew to 36 members by 1969, became disillusioned as they wrote the history; at one point when discussing what were the lessons of Vietnam, future general Paul F. Gorman, one of the historians, went up to the blackboard to write simply, "Don't." The team counted Gelb, Gorman, Melvin Gurtov, Hans Heymann, Richard Moorstein, Daniel Ellsberg, Richard Holbrooke, John Galvin, Paul Warnke and Morton Halperin among its members.

By January 1969, The Report of the Office of the Secretary of Defense Vietnam Task Force, as the Pentagon Papers were officially titled, was finished but widely ignored within the government. Gelb recalled that he presented the Papers to McNamara early that year, but McNamara did not read them then, and Gelb did not know as late as 2018 if McNamara ever did. Intended as the official record of U.S. military involvement in Indochina, the final report ran to 7,000 pages and was classified as "Top Secret – Sensitive."

The report was ultimately leaked in 1971 to The New York Times by Daniel Ellsberg, a former aide to McNamara's Assistant Secretary of Defense, John McNaughton. The leaked study became known as the Pentagon Papers, revealing that McNamara and others had been aware that the Vietnam offensive was futile. Subsequent efforts by the Nixon administration to prevent such leaks led indirectly to the Watergate scandal. In an interview, McNamara said that the Domino Theory was the main reason for entering the Vietnam War. He also stated, "Kennedy hadn't said before he died whether, faced with the loss of Vietnam, he would [completely] withdraw; but I believe today that had he faced that choice, he would have withdrawn."

== Equality of opportunity ==
To commemorate President Harry S Truman's signing an order to end segregation in the military, McNamara issued Directive 5120.36 on 26 July 1963. This directive, Equal Opportunity in the Armed Forces, dealt directly with the issue of racial and gender discrimination in areas surrounding military communities. The directive declared, "Every military commander has the responsibility to oppose discriminatory practices affecting his men and their dependents and to foster equal opportunity for them, not only in areas under his immediate control, but also in nearby communities where they may live or gather in off-duty hours." (para. II.C.) Under the directive, commanding officers were obligated to use the economic power of the military to influence local businesses in their treatment of minorities and women. With the approval of the Secretary of Defense, the commanding officer could declare areas off-limits to military personnel for discriminatory practices. While McNamara's directive dealing with the issue of racial and gender discrimination in areas surrounding military communities was issued in 1963, it was not until 1967 that the first non-military establishment was declared off-limits. In 1970 the requirement that commanding officers first obtain permission from the Secretary of Defense was lifted.

== Non-Defense Department matters ==
=== Supersonic Transport (SST) ===
McNamara was highly skeptical of the U.S. supersonic transport project and savaged the FAA's pro-SST study after reviewing it. He was afraid the project might be turned over to the Defense Department and so he pressed for further studies.

== Departure ==
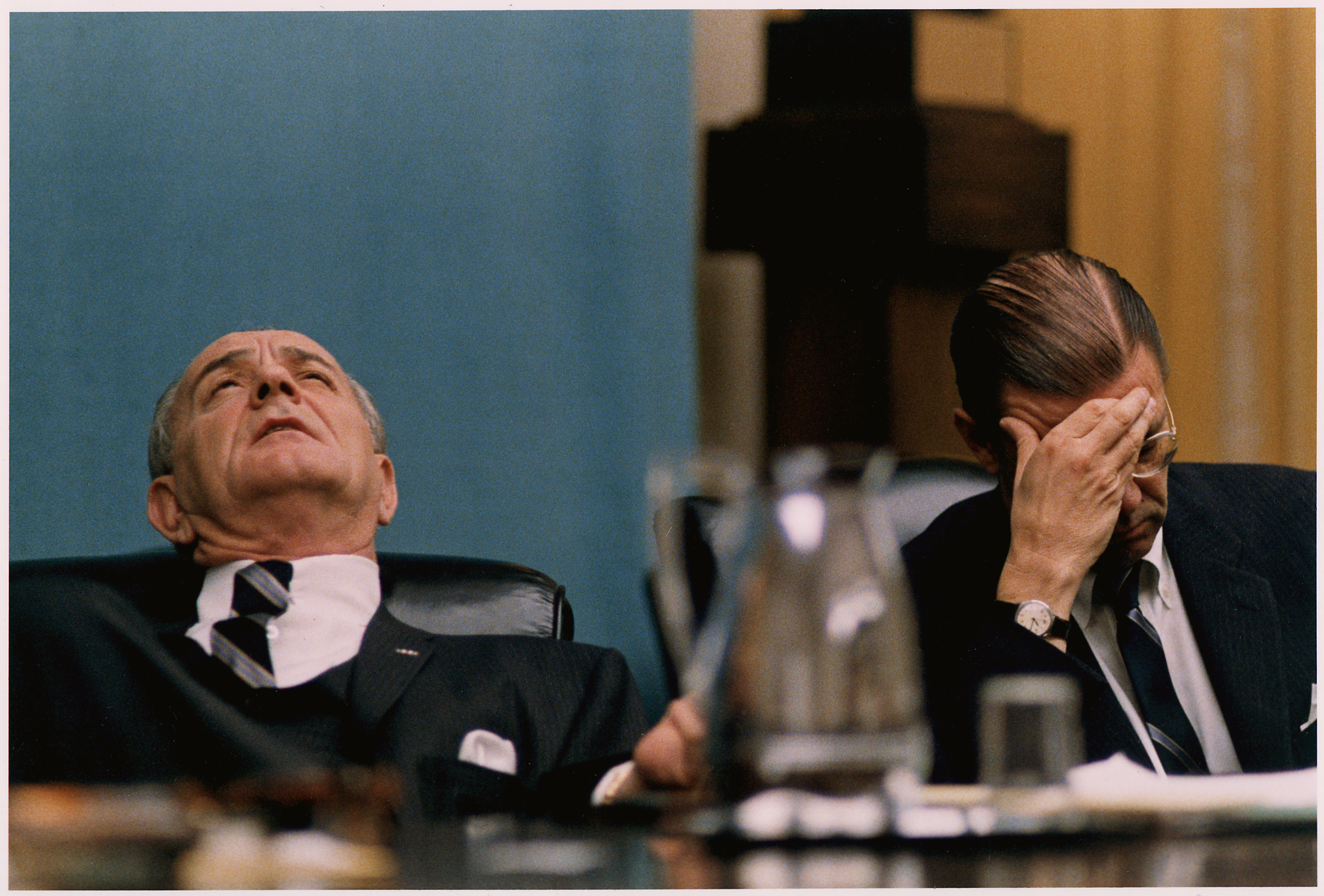
President Lyndon B. Johnson and McNamara at a cabinet meeting, 7 February 1968

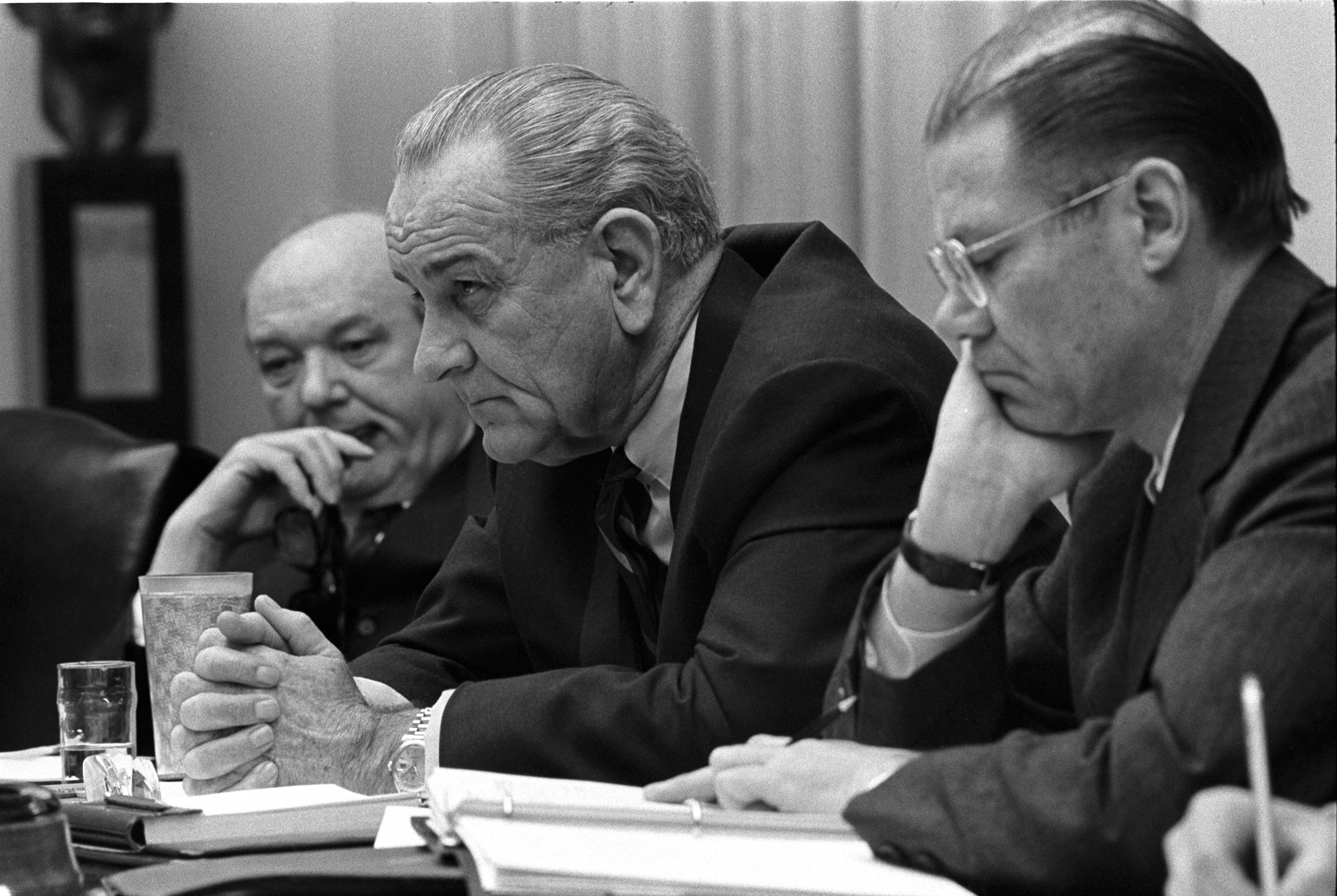
Cabinet meeting with Dean Rusk, President Johnson and McNamara, 9 February 1968

McNamara wrote of his close personal friendship with Jacqueline Kennedy and how she demanded that he stop the killing in Vietnam. As McNamara grew more and more controversial after 1966 and his differences with the President and the Joint Chiefs of Staff over Vietnam War strategy became public speculation, frequent rumors surfaced that he would leave office. By 1967, McNamara was suffering visibly from the nervous strain as he went days without shaving and he suffered spasms where his jaw would quiver uncontrollably for hours. Johnson said about him: "You know, he's a fine man, a wonderful man, Bob McNamara. He has given everything, just about everything, and, you know, we just can't afford another Forrestal" (a reference to the first Defense Secretary, James Forrestal, who committed suicide due to work-related stress and depression). McNamara would later deny that he was ever at risk of a breakdown.

=== 1967 Senate Armed Forces Committee hearing ===
Senator John C. Stennis was a conservative Southern Democrat who enjoyed much influence as a senior member of the Senate Armed Forces Committee. Stennis saw himself more as a champion of the military rather than its overseer, and as such the military often leaked information to him, in the full knowledge that he would take up their cause on Capitol Hill. Reflecting their unhappiness with McNamara's leadership, in the spring of 1967 senior generals and admirals let Stennis know of their belief that the Defense Secretary was mismanaging the war. This led Stennis to schedule hearings for the Senate Armed Forces Committee in August 1967 to examine the charge that "unskilled civilian amateurs" (i.e. McNamara) were not letting "professional military experts" win the war. He charged that McNamara had placed too many restrictions on bombing North Vietnam to protect innocent North Vietnamese civilians. The chairman of the Senate Armed Forces Committee, Senator Richard Russell Jr., was opposed to the war, but he expressed his opposition in the most cautious and lukewarm terms as he did not wish to appear unpatriotic, and so the hawkish Stennis enjoyed more power than his title of deputy chairman of the committee would suggest.

The hearings opened on 8 August 1967, and Stennis called as his witnesses numerous admirals and Air Force generals who all testified to their belief that the United States was fighting with "one arm tied behind its back", implicitly criticizing McNamara's leadership. They complained of "overtly restrictive controls" in bombing North Vietnam that they claimed were preventing them from winning the war. When McNamara himself appeared as a witness before the Senate Armed Forces Committee on 25 August 1967, he defended the war in very lukewarm terms that strongly suggested he had lost faith in the war, testifying that the bombing campaign against North Vietnam was ineffective, making the question of the bombing restrictions meaningless. McNamara described all of the 57 restricted targets as either of no importance such as a tire factory in Hanoi that produced only 30 tires per day or carried too much risk of hitting Soviet ships bringing supplies to North Vietnam. He warned that the prospect of American bombers damaging or sinking Soviet merchantmen while wounding or killing Soviet sailors carried too much risk of causing World War Three. McNamara testified that the bombing campaign had failed to reduce the supplies coming down the Ho Chi Minh trail as the Viet Cong needed only 15 tons of supplies per day to continue to fight and "even if the quantity were five times that amount, it could be transported by only a few trucks". McNamara went on to say that the bombing raids had not damaged the North Vietnamese economy which was "agrarian and simple" and the North Vietnamese people were unfamiliar with "the modern comforts and conveniences that most of us in the Western world take for granted". McNamara also stated that North Vietnamese morale was not broken by the bombing offensive as the North Vietnamese people were "accustomed to discipline and are no strangers to deprivation and death" while everything indicated the leadership in Hanoi were not affected by the bombing raids. Thus, he lacked "any confidence that they can be bombed to the negotiating table". McNamara concluded that only some sort of genocide could actually win the war, stating: "Enemy operations in the south cannot, on the basis of any reports I have seen be stopped by air bombardment-short, that is, of the virtual annihilation of North Vietnam and its people".

Besides Stennis, the other members of the Senate Armed Forces Committee were senators Henry M. Jackson, Strom Thurmond and Stuart Symington, all of whom were very hostile to McNamara in their questioning of him. Senator Thurmond reproached McNamara: "I think it is a statement of placating the Communists. It is a statement of appeasing the Communists. It is a statement of no-win". Privately, McNamara felt that Thurmond was an "ass", saying he was a bigoted, ignorant Southern politician whose only values were a mindless militarism, a fervent belief in white supremacy and a fondness for marrying women far younger than himself. McNamara felt that it was beneath him to be questioned by Thurmond, which explained why he was notably truculent in his answers to him.

Stennis wrote the committee's report which accused McNamara of having "consistently overruled the unanimous recommendations of military commanders and the joint chiefs of staff", whom Stennis wrote had proposed "systematic, timely and hard-hitting actions". Stennis damned McNamara for putting in bombing restrictions to protect North Vietnamese civilians and claimed that the war could be easily won if only McNamara would just obey all of the advice he received from the military. Stennis was not influenced by the hearings as he had written the committee's report before the hearings had even began.

Johnson saw the hearings as proof that it was time to dismiss McNamara, whom he believed was "cracking up" under the strain of the war, as reflected in the Defense Secretary's criticism of the Rolling Thunder bombings. Stennis, an ardent white supremacist who had fiercely opposed Johnson's civil rights legislation, was an old enemy of Johnson's, which led the president to decide not to sack McNamara in August 1967 as that would be seen as a victory by Stennis, and instead to wait a few months to fire him. In an interview with his biographer, Doris Kearns Goodwin, Johnson stated that McNamara was "cracking up" as the pressures of the war were too much for him, and so he decided to fire him as it would have been "a damn unfair thing to force him to stay". Johnson had long resented and hated the Kennedy brothers, whom he thought looked down upon him as "white trash" from Texas. Senator Robert F. Kennedy had emerged as a leading critic of the war by 1967, and Johnson stated to Kearns his belief that McNamara had suffered a nervous breakdown, of which Kennedy, a close friend of McNamara, had taken advantage of. Johnson told Kearns: "Every day, Bobby [Kennedy] would call up McNamara telling him that the war was terrible and immoral, and that he had to leave". To soften the blow, Johnson claimed to Kearns that he had talked it over with McNamara and had decided to offer him the presidency of the World Bank, "the only job he really wanted then". Johnson had chosen the job of World Bank president for McNamara because its rules prohibited the president from involving himself in the domestic affairs of member nations, which would prevent McNamara from criticizing the war after he left office. Johnson's biggest fear was that if he fired McNamara, then he might join with Kennedy in criticizing him and the war; given his status as the longest-serving Defense Secretary, such criticism would be especially damaging.

==== Joint Chiefs 1967 resignation plan ====
When a reporter asked McNamara if the Stennis hearings indicated a rift between him and the Joint Chiefs of Staff, McNamara replied: "My polices don't differ with those of the Joint Chiefs and I think they would be the first to say it". General Earle Wheeler, the Chairman of the Joint Chiefs of Staff had become dissatisfied with McNamara's leadership and was outraged by that remark. In response to McNamara's claim that the Joint Chiefs supported him, he proposed that the Joint Chiefs all resign in protest at McNamara's leadership. General Harold K. Johnson of the Army, who erroneously blamed McNamara for Lyndon Johnson's decision not to call up the Reserves in 1965, agreed to Wheeler's plan with his only regret being that he did not resign in 1965. The plan collapsed when General Wallace M. Greene of the Marine Corps refused to go along with it.

=== March on the Pentagon ===
On 21 October 1967, McNamara saw the March on the Pentagon anti-war protest from his office in the Pentagon. He witnessed hippie girls placing flowers in the guns of the D.C National Guardsmen standing in front of the Pentagon. McNamara described the scene as "hellish" as the hippie girls bared their breasts to tempt the Guardsmen to "make love, not war" while other hippies spat in the faces of the Guardsmen. However, despite seeing the March on the Pentagon demonstrators as a sign of social decay, his characteristic competitive spirit came to the fore as he argued that if he had been leading the March on the Pentagon, he would have taken over the Pentagon and shut it down, saying hippies lacked the necessary discipline and intelligence. On 31 October 1967, McNamara wrote Johnson a memo which he sent the next day saying that the war could not be continued as it "would be dangerous, costly in lives and unsatisfactory to the American people". Johnson wrote on the margins on the memo remarks such as "How do we get this conclusion?" and "Why believe this?"

=== Resignation ===
In an early November 1967 memorandum to Johnson, McNamara's recommendation to freeze troop levels, stop bombing North Vietnam and for the U.S. to hand over ground fighting to South Vietnam was rejected outright by the President. McNamara's recommendations amounted to his saying that the strategy of the United States in Vietnam which had been pursued to date had failed. McNamara later stated he "never heard back" from Johnson regarding the memo. Largely as a result, on 29 November of that year, McNamara announced his pending resignation and that he would become President of the World Bank. Other factors were the increasing intensity of the anti-war movement in the U.S., the approaching presidential campaign in which Johnson was expected to seek re-election, and McNamara's support—over the objections of the Joint Chiefs of Staff, of construction along the 17th parallel separating South and North Vietnam of a line of fortifications running from the coast of Vietnam into Laos. The President's announcement of McNamara's move to the World Bank stressed his stated interest in the job and that he deserved a change after seven years as Secretary of Defense (longer than any of his predecessors or successors).

Others give different views of McNamara's departure from office. For example, Stanley Karnow in his book Vietnam: A History strongly suggests that McNamara was asked to leave by the President. The historian Arthur Schlesinger, Jr stated that he was present during a conversation between McNamara and Senator Kennedy during which the former told the latter that he only learned from reading the newspapers of Johnson's announcement that he had just "resigned" as Defense Secretary and had been appointed president of the World Bank. McNamara himself expressed uncertainty about the question. (Note: In the documentary The Fog of War, McNamara recounted what he told his friend Katharine Graham about his departure as Secretary of Defense: "Even to this day, Kay, I don't know whether I quit or was fired?") On 17 November 1967, a story in the Financial Times of London based on leaked sources in Washington stated McNamara was going to be the next World Bank president, which came as a considerable surprise to McNamara. Afterwards, McNamara met with Kennedy who told him to resign in protest and denounce the war as unwinnable, counsel that McNamara rejected, saying that Johnson had been a friend and that he was still loyal to him. When McNamara refused to resign, Kennedy told him that he should turn down the World Bank presidency and join him in criticizing the war, which McNamara refused to do. Johnson knew that McNamara was concerned about poverty in the Third World, and that the possibility of serving as World Bank president would be too tempting for McNamara to resist.

McNamara left office on 29 February 1968; for his efforts, the President awarded him both the Medal of Freedom and the Distinguished Service Medal. McNamara's last day as Defense Secretary was memorable. The hawkish National Security Adviser, Walt Rostow, argued at a cabinet meeting that day that the United States was on the verge of winning the war. Rostow urged Johnson to send 206,000 more American troops to South Vietnam to join the half-million already there and to drastically increase the number of bombing raids on North Vietnam. At that point, McNamara snapped in fury at Rostow, saying: "What then? This goddamned bombing campaign, it's worth nothing, it's done nothing, they dropped more bombs than on all of Europe in all of World War II and it hasn't done a fucking thing!" McNamara then broke down in tears, saying to Johnson to just accept that the war could not be won and stop listening to Rostow. Henry McPherson, an aide to the president, recalled the scene: "He reeled off the familiar statistics-how we had dropped more bombs on Vietnam than on all of Europe during World War II. Then his voice broke, and there were tears on his eyes as he spoke of the futility, the crushing futility of the air war. The rest of us sat silently-I for one with my mouth open, listening to the secretary of defense talk that way about a campaign for which he had, ultimately, been responsible. I was pretty shocked".

Shortly after McNamara departed the Pentagon, he published The Essence of Security, discussing various aspects of his tenure and position on basic national security issues. He did not speak out again on defense issues or Vietnam until after he left the World Bank.

== Legacy ==
=== Credibility gap ===
The so-called "Credibility gap," a public distrust due to perception of large differences between government statements and factual accuracy, would greatly increase in large part due to McNamara's actions during his tenure.

=== Gradualism ===
McNamara's advocacy of gradual escalations of military power, seen first in the Cuban Missile Crisis and later Indochina, was repudiated by later strategists. The 1991 Gulf War was deliberately conducted by American forces with a non-gradualist strategy; per General Jimmie V. Adams: “I think we learned a lot of lessons in Vietnam, and one of them is that gradualism does not work.”

=== McNamara fallacy ===
McNamara's bias in favor of quantitative metrics to the detriment of qualitative considerations has been seen as an example of flawed decision making, and has been christened the McNamara fallacy.

=== Micromanagement ===
Admiral George Anderson would later accuse McNamara of micromanagement during the Cuban Missile Crisis. In addition, McNamara's designation of aircraft 'times-over-targets' [TOTs] (which contributed to their downing), and the White House selection of targets during Operation Rolling Thunder, would cause the U.S. military to attempt to resist civilian micromanagement in future operations.

== See also ==
- Robert McNamara § See also
- List of United States political appointments that crossed party lines
- Path to War
- Project 100,000 – aka McNamara's Folly
- Project Dye Marker
- The Fog of War
- Clark Clifford § Vietnam

Notable colleagues and subordinates

- George Whelan Anderson Jr. – USN, State
- John Boyd – USAF
- Harold Brown – DoD
- McGeorge Bundy – White House
- William Bundy – DoD, State
- Lucien Conein – ex-USA, CIA
- Thomas F. Connolly – USN
- Dieter Dengler – USN
- Daniel Ellsberg – ex-USMC, DoD, State, RAND
- Alain Enthoven – DoD
- Harry D. Felt – USN
- Desmond FitzGerald – CIA
- John Galvin – USA
- Leslie H. Gelb – DoD
- Roswell Gilpatric – DoD
- Andrew Goodpaster - USA
- Paul F. Gorman – USA
- Wallace M. Greene – USMC
- Morton Halperin – DoD
- Paul D. Harkins – USA
- W. Averell Harriman – State
- John J. Herrick – USN
- Charles J. Hitch – DoD
- Richard Holbrooke – State
- Hamilton Howze – USA
- Harold Keith Johnson – USA
- Lyman Kirkpatrick – CIA
- Charles Klusmann – USN
- Fred Korth – DoD
- Victor H. Krulak – USMC
- Edward Lansdale – USAF
- Curtis LeMay – USAF
- Lyman Lemnitzer – USA
- Henry Cabot Lodge Jr. – State
- John P. McConnell – USAF
- Lionel C. McGarr – USA
- John McNaughton – DoD
- Joseph A. Mendenhall – State
- Frederick Nolting – State
- William R. Peers – USA
- Rufus Phillips – ex-CIA, USAID
- Hyman G. Rickover – USN, AEC
- Walt Rostow – State, White House
- Dean Rusk – State
- Bernard Schriever – USAF
- U. S. Grant Sharp Jr. – USN
- Elvis Jacob Stahr Jr. – DoD
- Walter C. Sweeney Jr. – USAF
- Maxwell D. Taylor – USA, State
- John Paul Vann – USA, USAID
- Paul Warnke – DoD
- William Westmoreland – USA
- Earle Wheeler – USA
- Adam Yarmolinsky - DoD

== Bibliography ==
This list is abbreviated for McNamara's works that are cited in this article. For the full list see Robert McNamara § Bibliography.

Books

- McNamara, Robert S. (1968). The Essence of Security: Reflections in Office. New York: Harper & Row.
- McNamara, Robert S.; VanDeMark, Brian (1995). In Retrospect: The Tragedy and Lessons of Vietnam. New York: Times Books. ISBN 978-0679767497.

Memoranda

- McNamara, Robert (February 19, 1968a). "Memorandum for the President, 19 February 1968". Khe Sanh Declassified Documents.

Transcripts

- McNamara, Robert S. (June 1962). "The No-Cities Doctrine: University of Michigan Commencement".
- Civil Defense Role in U.S. Strategic Defensive Forces Outlined for Congress by Secretary McNamara. Washington, D.C.: U.S. Department of Defense, 1966.
- McNamara, Robert S. (May 18, 1966). "Security in the Contemporary World" (PDF).

== Media ==
Documentary films

- Morris, Erroll (2003). The Fog of War: Eleven Lessons from the Life of Robert S. McNamara. YouTube. The Fog of War: Transcript.
- Morris, Erroll (2003). The Fog of War: Eleven Lessons from the Life of Robert S. McNamara (trailer). YouTube.
- Gregory, Hamilton (April 29, 2016). McNamara's Folly: The Use of Low-IQ Troops in the Vietnam War. YouTube.

Television

- The Missiles of October, a docudrama about the Cuban Missile Crisis (1974). Robert McNamara was played by Dana Elcar.
- Cuban Missile Crisis Revisited. Produced for The Idea Channel by the Free to Choose Network. (1983)
  - Phase II, Part I (U1016) (June 27, 1983)
    - Featuring Robert S. McNamara, McGeorge Bundy, Richard Neustadt, George W. Ball & U. Alexis Johnson in Washington D.C.
  - Phase II, Part II (U1017) (June 27, 1983)
    - Featuring Robert S. McNamara, McGeorge Bundy, Richard Neustadt, George W. Ball & U. Alexis Johnson in Washington D.C.

Political offices
Preceded by Thomas Gates	United States Secretary of Defense; 1961–1968	Succeeded by Clark Clifford
