= The Best and the Brightest =

1972 book by David Halberstam on the Vietnam War

- First edition
- Author: David Halberstam
- Language: English
- Subject: Vietnam War
- Published: 1972 (Random House)
- Publication place: United States
- Media type: Print (hardcover and paperback)
- Pages: 697
- ISBN: 978-0679640998

The Best and the Brightest (1972) is a book about the origins of the Vietnam War by the journalist David Halberstam and published by Random House. The book focuses on the foreign policy crafted by academics and intellectuals who were in President John F. Kennedy's administration and on the consequences of that policy in Vietnam. The book title refers to Kennedy's "whiz kids"—leaders of industry and academia brought into his administration—whom Halberstam characterizes as insisting on "brilliant policies that defied common sense" in Vietnam, policies often implemented against the advice of career U.S. Department of State employees.

== Summary ==
Halberstam's book offers details on how decisions were made in the Kennedy and Johnson administrations that led to the war, focusing on the period from 1960 to 1965 but also covering earlier and later years up until publication.

Factors examined:

- The Democratic Party was haunted by claims that it had "lost" China to the Communists, and it did not want to be accused of also losing Vietnam. Thus, the decision to intervene in Vietnam militarily was based on political expediency, the need to win a second term, and not on rationality.
- The McCarthy era had rid the government of experts on Vietnam and surrounding countries.
- Early studies (which had discouraged a 1954 intervention) called for close to one million U.S. troops to defeat the Viet Cong, but it would have been impossible to convince Congress or the U.S. public to deploy so many soldiers; defense officials came to believe that new technologies, especially helicopters, would make such numbers unnecessary.
- Declaration of war and excessive use of force, including bombing too close to China or too many U.S. troops, might have triggered the invasion of Chinese ground forces or greater Soviet involvement, which might repair the growing Sino-Soviet rift.
- The American military and generals were not prepared for protracted guerrilla warfare. (Note: In fact, the military resisted most preparations for guerrilla warfare, see Robert McNamara as Secretary of Defense § Counter-insurgency.)
- Some war games predicted that a gradual escalation by the United States would be matched by North Vietnam: every year, 200,000 North Vietnamese reached draft age and could be sent down the Ho Chi Minh Trail to replace losses against the U.S.: the U.S. would be "fighting the birthrate".
- Use of bombing or ground forces would signal the U.S. commitment to defending South Vietnam and subsequently cause U.S. shame if they withdrew.
- President Johnson believed that too much attention given to the war effort would jeopardize his Great Society domestic programs.
- The effects of strategic bombing: Most people believed that North Vietnam prized its industrial base so highly it would not risk its destruction by U.S. air power and would negotiate peace after experiencing limited bombing. Others saw that, even during World War II, strategic bombing united the civilian population against the aggressor and did little to hinder industrial output.
- After placing a few thousand Americans in harm's way, it became politically easier to send hundreds of thousands with the promise that, given sufficient numbers, they could protect themselves and that to abandon Vietnam would mean the earlier investment in money and blood would be lost. (Note: “They want a force of American troops,” President Kennedy told Arthur Schlesinger at the time. “They say it’s necessary in order to restore confidence and maintain morale. But it will be just like Berlin. The troops will march in, the bands will play, the crowds will cheer, and in four days everyone will have forgotten. Then we will be told we have to send in more troops. It’s like taking a drink. The effect wears off and you have to take another.”)
- The gradual escalation allowed the Johnson Administration to avoid early negative publicity and criticism from Congress and to avoid a direct war against the Chinese, but it also reduced the likelihood of either victory or withdrawal.

== Origin of the title ==
The title may have come from a line by Percy Bysshe Shelley in his work "To Jane: The Invitation" (1822):

Best and brightest, come away!

Shelley's line may have originated from English bishop and hymn writer Reginald Heber in his 1811 work, "Hymns. Epiphany":

Brightest and best of the sons of the morning,
Dawn on our darkness, and lend us thine aid.

A still earlier, and more pertinent, use of the phrase is in the letter of Junius published February 7, 1769, in the Public Advertiser. There Junius uses it mockingly and ironically in reference to King George III's ministers, whose capacities he had disparaged in his first letter the previous month. In response to Sir William Draper's letter defending one of Junius' targets and attacking their anonymous critics, Junius wrote:

To have supported your assertion, you should have proved that the present ministry are unquestionably the best and brightest characters of the kingdom; and that, if the affections of the colonies have been alienated, if Corsica has been shamefully abandoned, if commerce languishes, if public credit is threatened with a new debt, and your own Manilla ransom most dishonorably given up, it has all been owing to the malice of political writers, who will not suffer the best and brightest characters (meaning still the present ministry) to take a single right step, for the honor or interest of the nation.

In the introduction to the 1992 edition, Halberstam stated that he had used the title earlier in an article for Harper's Magazine, and that Mary McCarthy criticized him in a book review for incorrectly referencing the line in the Shelley poem. Halberstam claimed he had no knowledge of the earlier use of the term in the Heber hymn. Halberstam also observed regarding the "best and the brightest" phrase, that "...hymn or no, it went into the language, although it is often misused, failing to carry the tone or irony that the original intended." In the book's introduction and a 2001 interview, Halberstam claims that the title came from a line in an article he had written about the Kennedy Administration.

== Reception ==
The book was highly acclaimed upon release. Victor Saul Navasky, writing in The New York Times, said it was Halberstam's "most important and impressive book", citing its "compelling and persuasively presented thesis." Liaquat Ahamed compared its writing style to a "great novel," praising Halberstam's "storyteller's talent for capturing people" and ability to write a "compelling narrative." Steve Mariotti called it his "favorite book."

In 2011, Time named it as one of the 100 best English non-fiction books written since 1923.

== Errata ==
Like any major work, The Best and the Brightest contains minor errors.

- On page 143, Halberstam wrote "In 1954, in the last dying days of the French presence in Indochina, the Lansdale group had run around Hanoi putting sugar in the gas tanks of Vietminh trucks, a gesture of no small amount of mindlessness.” Lucien Conein, the leader of the 'Lansdale group' in Hanoi, took umbrage at this description: “Sugar?” Conein fumed. “That was a high-school trick, something a goddamn amateur might do, not a professional.” A professional like him used corrosive acid. The fumes from the acid canister nearly made Conein and [Arthur "Nick"] Arundel pass out. Dizzy and weak-kneed, they had to mask their faces with handkerchiefs to finish the job.
- On page 247, Halberstam wrote regarding Robert McNamara's powers of retention: "Once, sitting at CINCPAC for eight hours watching hundreds and hundreds of slides flashed across the screen showing what was in the pipe line to Vietnam and what was already there, he finally said, after seven hours, 'Stop the projector. This slide, number 869, contradicts slide 11.' Slide 11 was flashed back and he was right, they did contradict each other. Everyone was impressed, and many a little frightened." Unlike Halberstam, Rufus Phillips was an eyewitness to this event, and he later reported McNamara as saying “Stop—slide 319 does not agree with slide 5” and was proved correct upon retrieval of slide 5. (Note: This discrepancy in slide numbers is of minor importance, but is noted elsewhere and piped here for the full quote; the view of the military that NcNamara was frightening is notable.)
- On page 313, Halberstam wrote regarding the Krulak-Mendenhall mission, which was conducted on 6–10 September 1963: "In addition [W. Averell] Harriman, notified that two key members of the American mission in Saigon had changed their views, lobbied for them to come back with Krulak and Mendenhall to brief the White House. They were Rufus Phillips, who ran the crucial strategic hamlet program, which was part political and part military, and John Mecklin, head of the USIA in Saigon.” Rufus Phillips wrote in 2008 that he did not return with Krulak and Mendenhall: “In response to increasingly urgent messages that my father had cancer, I had booked a Pan American flight home for September 8.

== Criticism ==
=== Edward Lansdale ===
The historian Max Boot would later claim that Halberstam incorporated negative views of former General Edward Lansdale into The Best and the Brightest (principally Chapter 8, pages 141-145) due to the influence of Lansdale's bureaucratic opponents:

He [ Barry Zorthian ] would take a deep drag off his cigarette, look pensively out the window of his upstairs office, release a sigh of resignation with the smoke, and then speak to a reporter, softly, reluctantly, off-the-record and in all confidence of course, about poor Ed Lansdale, the hopeless romantic. There was always enough about Lansdale to provide evidence that he might be a well-meaning but slightly nutty soul, and Zorthian’s interpretation of him found its way into the works of David Halberstam and Frances FitzGerald, who were, ideologically, not overly resistant to the idea, and into the writings of other journalists.

== Legacy ==
The New York Times's Marc Tracy reported that Donald Trump's chief strategist Steve Bannon was reading the book in February 2017. Tracy drew a parallel between Robert McNamara's and Bannon's lack of experience in national security.

== See also ==
Notable quotations

- McNamara fallacy § 1964 meetings with Desmond FitzGerald
- McNamara fallacy § 1965 Da Nang visit
- Robert McNamara § Assessments
