= McNamara–Taylor mission =

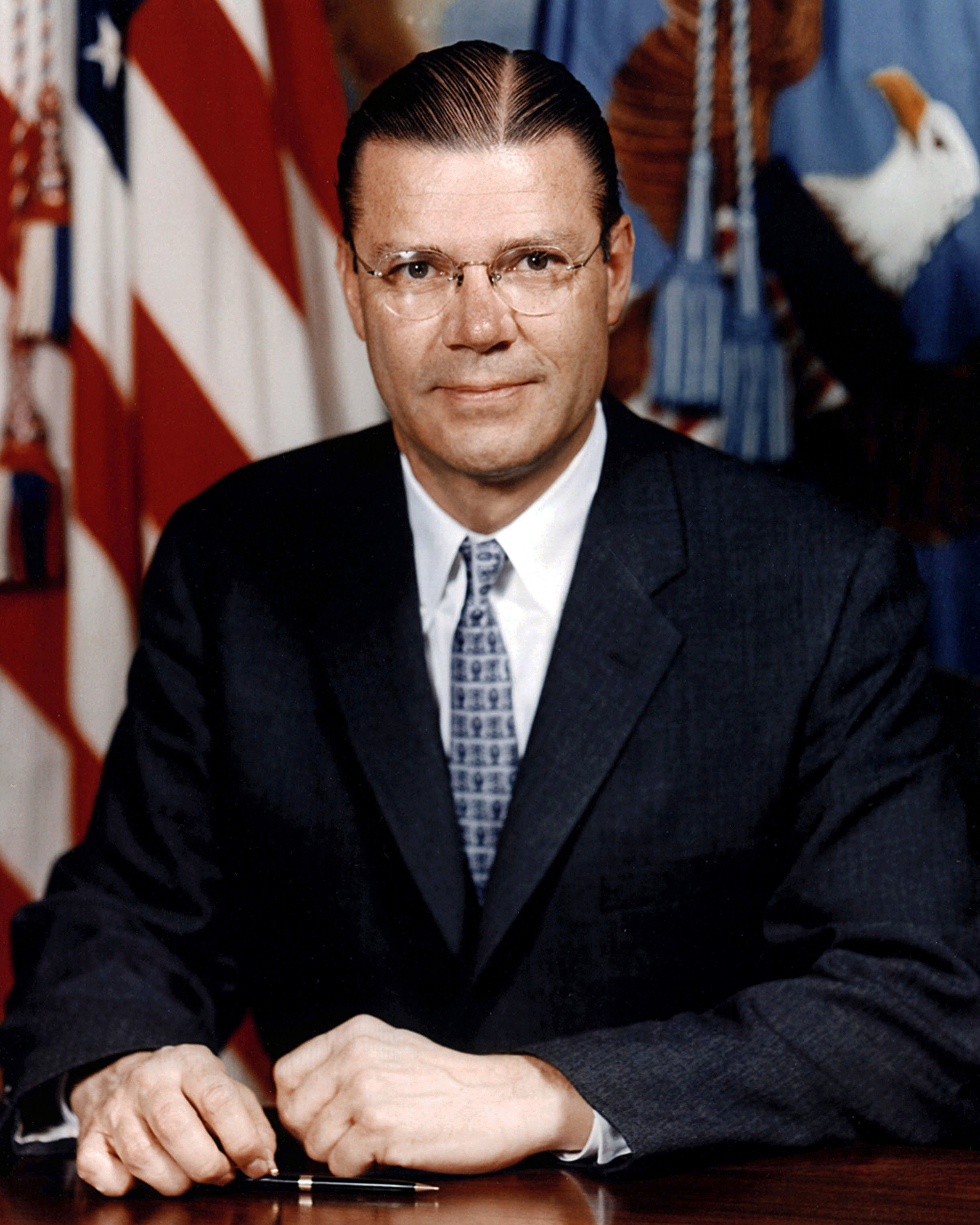
US Defense Secretary Robert McNamara

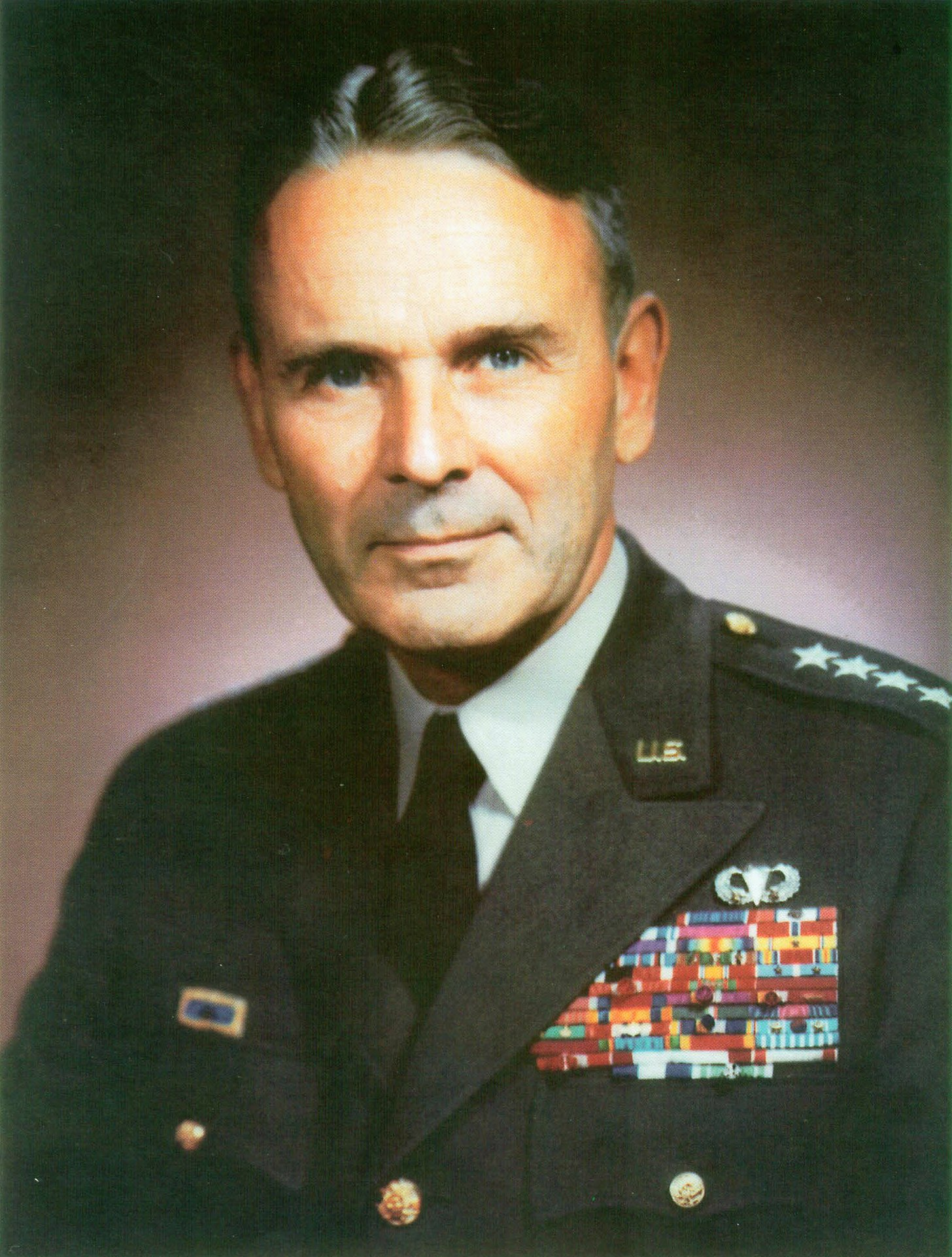
US Chairman of the Joint Chiefs of Staff Maxwell Taylor

The McNamara–Taylor mission was a 10-day fact-finding expedition to South Vietnam in September 1963 by the Kennedy administration to review progress in the battle by the Army of the Republic of Vietnam and its American advisers against the communist insurgency of the National Liberation Front of South Vietnam. The mission was led by US Secretary of Defense Robert McNamara and General Maxwell D. Taylor, the Chairman of the Joint Chiefs of Staff.

The mission came in the wake of the Krulak–Mendenhall mission in which United States Marine Corps General Victor Krulak and State Department official Joseph Mendenhall gave diametrically differing outlooks on the military and political situation in Vietnam. Upon their return, McNamara and Taylor recommended measures intended to restrict the regime of President Ngô Đình Diệm, feeling that Diệm was pre-occupied with suppressing dissent rather than fighting the communists. The measures also sought to pressure Diệm to respect human rights more.

== Background ==
In May, civil unrest broke out in South Vietnam following the Huế Phật Đản shootings. Nine Buddhists were gunned down by the minority Catholic regime of President Ngô Đình Diệm after defying a government ban on the flying of Buddhist flags on Vesak, the birthday of Gautama Buddha and marching in an anti-government protest. Following the shootings, Buddhist leaders began to lobby Diệm for religious equality and compensation and justice for the families of the victims. With Diệm remaining recalcitrant, the protests escalated. The self-immolation of Buddhist monk Thích Quảng Đức at a busy Saigon intersection was a public relations disaster for the Diệm regime, and as protests continued, the Army of the Republic of Vietnam Special Forces loyal to his brother Ngô Đình Nhu, raided pagodas across the country on August 21, killing hundreds and causing extensive damage under the declaration of martial law. Universities and high schools were closed amid mass pro-Buddhist protests. In the meantime, the fight against the Viet Cong insurgency had begun to lose intensity as rumours spread of sectarian infighting among ARVN troops. This was compounded by coup plotting by various ARVN officers which distracted attention from fighting the insurgency. In the aftermath of the pagoda raids, the Kennedy administration sent Cable 243 to its embassy in Saigon, ordering it to explore alternative leadership possibilities.

== Authorization of mission ==
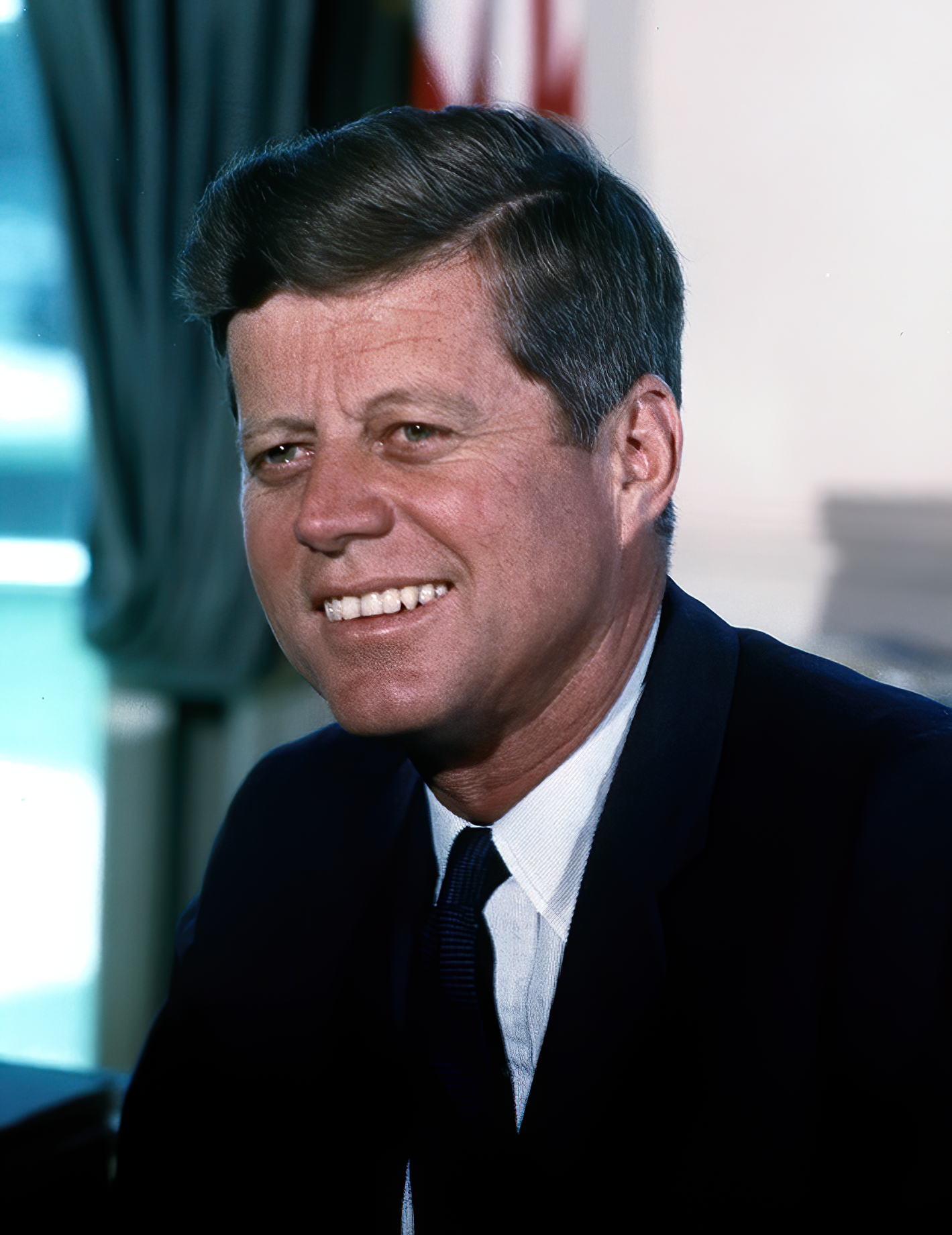
US President John F. Kennedy

US President John F. Kennedy gave the following instructions to McNamara regarding the purpose of the mission:

I am asking you to go because of my desire to have the best possible on-the-spot appraisal of the military and paramilitary effort to defeat the Viet Cong. . . . The events in South Vietnam since May have now raised serious questions both about the present prospects for success against the Viet Cong and still more about the future effectiveness of this effort unless there can be important political improvement in the country. It is in this context that I now need your appraisal of the situation. If the prognosis in your judgment is not hopeful, I would like your views on what action must be taken by the South Vietnamese Government and what steps our Government should take to lead the Vietnamese to that action.

The US ambassador in Saigon, Henry Cabot Lodge Jr. reacted immediately to the proposed mission, pointing out to Kennedy that such a high level visit would require McNamara and Taylor to visit Diệm. Since the pagoda raids, the Americans had been snubbing Diệm to show their disapproval of the conduct of his family in recent times. A visit by senior military figures such as Taylor and McNamara would be construed by the Ngos as a return to normal business. Since Lodge had been deliberately pursuing a strategy of official aloofness, he wondered whether such a high level delegation was desirable. Lodge worried that Diệm would use the visit as a propaganda move to claim that it was a restoration of US support. Kennedy recommended a strategy aimed at encouraging rebel generals in the ARVN to act. The White House and the Saigon embassy were to publicly state that the visit did not signify approval of Diệm's policies. McNamara was to "speak some home truths" and emphasize that the administration was not "open to oriental divisive tactics" and that the advancement of the military campaign was the sole objective.

In addition the missions was to coincide with the National Assembly elections on September 27. A visit during such a time could only be construed as an indication of the lack of importance that the United States attached to the poll. Kennedy insisted on the trip, so Lodge acquiesced, suggesting that the public press release state that Lodge had requested the visit. After an exchange of proposed phraseology, it was agreed that the release would say that Kennedy had decided to send the mission after consulting Lodge. Kennedy instructed Lodge to "clear the air" by convincing Diệm to make the "dramatic, symbolic move" of removing Nhu and refocusing the nation on the war effort.

== Objective ==
The stated purpose of the trip was fourfold:

1. To appraise the war effort
2. To assess the impact on that effort of recent political developments
3. To recommend a course of action for the Government of Vietnam and for the US
4. To examine with Lodge ways of tailoring our aid to achieve our foreign policy objectives.

In a statement to the media at Andrews Air Force Base just before leaving for Vietnam on September 23, McNamara said that the purpose of the trip was "to determine whether that military effort has been adversely affected by the unrest of the past several weeks". Privately, other White House officials contended that there were other reasons for the trip. Arthur Schlesinger and Assistant Secretary of State Roger Hilsman, contended that Kennedy sent McNamara and Taylor to Vietnam to convince them of the negative effect on the counterinsurgency that the protracted Buddhist crisis was having, and of the need to apply sanctions to the Diệm regime to bring about change. According to this hypothesis, Kennedy believed that he could not afford a major policy rift in the administration over the question of applying sanctions. He felt that this was particularly the case if any policy shift attracted the opposition of the Joint Chiefs of Staff, and concluded that only McNamara, if convinced, could convert the US military. Whatever the real purpose of the trip, McNamara and Taylor's party left Washington on September 23 and returned ten days later after an exhausting trip and a comprehensive review of the situation on the ground. They were accompanied by National Security Adviser Michael Forrestal, the CIA's William Colby, Deputy Assistant Secretary of Defense for International Security Affairs William Bundy and William Sullivan from the State Department.

An objective analysis of the situation in Vietnam was unlikely given the prejudice apparent on the journey to Vietnam. During the flight, Bundy and others received binders of materials, including a draft of the report that they were to prepare afterwards. Years after the mission, Forrestal asserted that the observations had already been "carefully spelled out, [with] all the statistics to back them up". He described it as a "dreadful visit" where the members attempt to accumulate "phony statistical" evidence of success.

== Expedition ==
The timing of the mission was crucial due to the pessimistic military forecasts and the widespread rumours of an imminent coup. Diệm's presidential military adviser Dương Văn Minh had recently informed Lodge that 80 percent of Vietnamese people had no motive for supporting Diệm and that the recent lifting of martial law was "eyewash for Americans". Despite his title, Minh had no command power and was confined to primarily ceremonial duties. Diệm feared that Minh had become too popular after his success in the Battle for Saigon against the criminal Bình Xuyên and his campaigns to quell the private armies of the Hòa Hảo and Cao Đài religious sects in the 1950s and had removed him from commanding troops. The two guardhouses outside Minh's headquarters at Tan Son Nhut Air Base were filled with political prisoners, many of them student protestors. Minh was widely believed to be seeking a coup against Diệm. He frequently railed against Diệm in his meeting with Lodge, decrying the police state that was being created by the Cần Lao Party of the Ngô family. Harkins reported that Minh "has done nothing but complain to me about the government and the way it is handled since I have been here". Harkins also put scepticism onto Minh's claims of widespread public disenchantment. The differing views of the members of the U.S. mission about the progress of the war against the Viet Cong, and how it was affected by the Buddhist crisis were immediately manifested in the first session that McNamara and Taylor held in Saigon with embassy officials on September 25. General Paul D. Harkins and his MACV staff generally presented a favourable picture of military progress, emphasizing the progress of the Strategic Hamlet Program, and the improved ARVN position. This was in spite of a recent surge in communist initiated incidents and a decline in ARVN operation due to the increased number of troops used to quell dissidents. McNamara and Taylor prompted the presenters with questions in an attempt to get comparative indicators of the evolution of the situation over the last two years. McNamara in particular probed for details about the military situation in the Mekong Delta. American civilian officials sharply disagreed with the assessment of their military colleagues in their reading of the situation. Lodge and John Mecklin of the United States Information Service viewed things more grimly. Lodge stressed the more political and intangible aspects of the war and cast doubt on the "hardness" of the statistical data provided by the MACV. With the Mission's division of opinion exposed, McNamara left to tour the countryside.

McNamara met for two hours with John H. Richardson, head of the CIA's mission in Saigon. Richardson argued that the situation was quickly deteriorating and stated that the country was engulfed in a "climate of suspicion." Richardson felt that there was a Catch-22 situation in that there was nobody who commanded Diệm's respect yet Diệm's continual hold on power would ensure disaster. Richardson felt Diệm's loyalty to family was handicapping him. Richardson reported that many cabinet ministers had wanted to resign in the wake of the pagoda raids but were afraid of being jailed or unwilling to go into exile.

McNamara's itinerary took him throughout the country, interviewing Americans and Vietnamese at both headquarters and in the field. In Saigon, during the last few days of the trip, he was given extensive briefings by the civilian side of the mission and, since he stayed at Lodge's residence, McNamara had ample opportunity for discussions with the Ambassador.

McNamara was shown first hand accounts of negative diagnoses of the military progress which contradicted the optimistic statements that he had been accustomed to giving. At one point during a military inspection tour, he visited a government "open arms" camp near Tam Kỳ. He pointed to a weapon from a pile of arms captured from Viet Cong insurgents and triumphantly asked "Is this Chinese?" only to be told by his embarrassed Vietnamese guide that it was an American rifle which had been earlier captured by the communists. Following a briefing from senior army officers which glossed over the capture of two towns in An Xuyên Province by the communists, Taylor and McNamara asked a major stationed at Cần Thơ to assess the situation. The young officer did not toe the line of his senior officers and gave a detailed and gloomy account of the situation before encouraging his colleagues to comment. According to Forrestal, "all hell broke loose." By the end of the trip, Bundy conceded that the evidence was eye opening, commenting that "I was left, as I think McNamara was, with a lasting skepticism of the ability of any man, however honest, to interpret accurately what was going on." Negative reports continued to reach the American delegation through a variety of Vietnamese civilian figures. A group of university professors complained to McNamara that Diệm had transformed the country into a police state with widespread use of torture. They asserted that this had prompted people to turn to the Viet Cong. The mission was also informed by the French embassy and the Canadian and Indian members of the International Control Commission that was charged with enforcing the Geneva Accords that Nhu was pursuing a peace agreement with North Vietnam and that an agreement would be reached in the next three or four months.

=== Meeting with Diệm ===
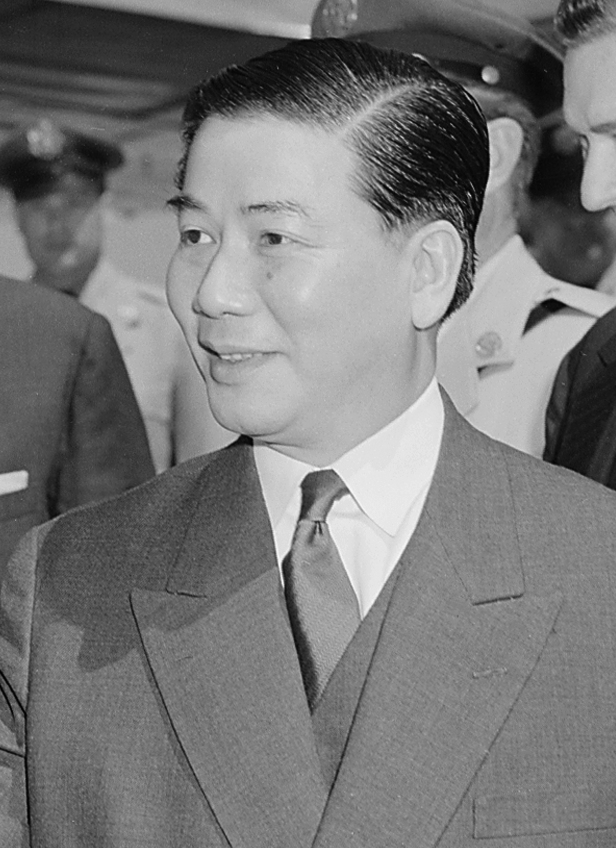
President Ngô Đình Diệm of South Vietnam

On September 29, McNamara, Taylor, Harkins, and Lodge visited Diệm, having decided against delivering a bluntly worded letter from Kennedy. Diệm was accompanied by his Secretary of State Nguyễn Đình Thuận. Diệm spoke passionately in defense of his government and chain smoked as he walked around the room pointing to maps. After a two-hour monologue by Diệm, McNamara was finally able to speak. He stressed American concerns that political unrest was undermining anti-Viet Cong military operations. McNamara emphasized the difficulties being caused by anti-Buddhist repressions were creating for Kennedy's support of South Vietnam due to the arousal of negative public opinion against Diệm. He pointed out that Diệm's foreign minister Vũ Văn Mẫu and his ambassador in Washington Trần Văn Chương had resigned, and that Saigon University was closed. McNamara fell short of asking Diệm to remove the Nhus; this was a matter Washington had left to his and Lodge's discretion. McNamara went on to say that Washington did not see value in supporting a government which could not command the confidence of its citizens, but his comments seemed to have little impact on Diệm. Diệm cut off McNamara and asserted that "Vietnam will be a model democracy" in a few years time. He asserted that this had been facilitated by the Strategic Hamlet Program and was shown in the high turnout in the recent legislative elections. Lodge became irritated at this point and derisively pointed out that Diệm's legislators had achieved increased votes because ARVN troops had been bussed around to vote multiple times at various polling booths. Diệm himself had risen to power in a fraudulent referendum supervised by Nhu in which he was credited with 133% of the vote in Saigon.

The awkward silence was broken when McNamara raised the issue of Madame Nhu. Diệm was a bachelor so Madame Nhu was the de facto First Lady, living in the palace. Dubbed the Dragon Lady due to her acerbic nature, she had a long history of anti-American remarks. McNamara complained about her "ill-advised and unfortunate declarations". He removed a newspaper clipping from his pocket in which she was quoted as calling some US officers as "acting like little soldiers of fortune" which she claimed had caused the Americans to pursue a "confused policy". McNamara said that such comment hurt the bilateral relationship and that the American public would be less generous in sending their officers to support the anti-communist counterinsurgency. One of the Americans lost his composure and asked Diệm whether "there was not something the government could do to shut her up." Diệm appeared to be shocked and demoralised by the stinging question. Lodge pointedly claimed that Madame Chiang Kai-shek had been pivotal in the defeat of the Chinese Nationalists by the communists of Mao Zedong in 1949 and alluded that Madame Nhu could have a similar effect. Diệm dismissed this and said that US policy was being undermined by failures in analysis of the situation that he claimed were fuelled by distorted attacks by American journalists in Saigon. He asserted that Madame Nhu's membership in the National Assembly as a citizen of a "free country" allowed her to express her sentiments, alleging that "one cannot deny a lady the right to defend herself when she has been unjustly attacked."

Diệm went on to make sensational claims against the Buddhist majority that had his visitors taken aback. He asserted that his kindness towards Buddhists had helped to cause the civil unrest by encouraging them to seek what he felt were special rights. He claimed that the number of Buddhist pagodas in the country had doubled during his rule and said that it was due to his government's funding. For twenty minutes he repeatedly charged the Buddhists of partaking in orgies in the pagodas on a regular basis, without offering proof. He then alleged that "some American services in Saigon" were plotting against him. Taylor later noted that Diệm had not realised the seriousness of the meeting and the warnings of the American delegation, recalling that "You could just see it bouncing off him."

Diệm asked Taylor for his appraisal of the war, and after being approved by McNamara, a long letter from the general was delivered to Diệm on October 2. The letter outlined the major military problems in the Delta, warned of the danger that the Buddhist crisis posed to the war effort, and listed many of the specific steps needed to improve the military effort that later appeared in the report presented to Kennedy. The letter summarised with a terse, tough statement of the American view:

Up to now, the battle against the Viet Cong has seemed endless; no one has been willing to set a date for its successful conclusion. After talking to scores of officers, Vietnamese and American, I am convinced that the Viet Cong insurgency in the north and center can be reduced to little more than sporadic incidents by the end of 1964. The Delta will take longer but should be completed by the end of 1965. But for these predictions to be valid, certain conditions must be met. Your Government should be prepared to energize all agencies, military and civil, to a higher output of activity than up to now. Ineffective commanders and province officials must be replaced as soon as identified. Finally, there should be a restoration of domestic tranquility on the home front if political tensions are to be allayed and external criticism is to abate. Conditions are needed for the creation of an atmosphere conducive to an effective campaign directed at the objective, vital to both of us, of defeating the Viet Cong and of restoring peace to your community.

=== Coup speculation ===
The mission took a diversion into investigating a possible coup by ARVN officers when General Dương Văn Minh expressed an interest in meeting McNamara and Taylor, either alone or together. After an extensive series of discretionary arrangements were made, Taylor joined Minh in a game of doubles on the tennis court of the Saigon Officers Club. McNamara watched on as Taylor played with Minh, waiting anxiously for any signals from Minh to "broad hints of our interest in other subjects which we gave him during breaks in the game". Minh revealed nothing of his thoughts about a possible coup, leaving his guest bewildered to his intentions in inviting them. McNamara later grumbled to Kennedy that "I sat on a sideline two feet from Big Minh for over an hour and I couldn't get a damn thing out of him." Taylor got one of the tennis players, Colonel Raymond Jones, to contact Minh about the situation, to which Minh replied with a complaint about a perceived lack of support from Washington for a coup. Minh claimed that he thought McNamara and Taylor were seeking nothing but a match of tennis and offered to discuss military affairs at any time.

=== Meeting with civilian officials ===
On September 30, Taylor and McNamara's last day in Vietnam, together with Lodge, the trio met with South Vietnamese Vice President Nguyễn Ngọc Thơ. Tho thanked the US for its continued support and response to the recommendations outlined in a report by Taylor prepared in 1961. However, he asserted that the Americans had failed in recent times in using their strength and influence to prevent the political deterioration in South Vietnam. Tho did not offer any methods to rectify this and went on to sharply question the success of the Strategic Hamlet Program. Tho said that increased Viet Cong strength had to be attributed to widespread rural discontent with the Diệm regime. According to the Pentagon Papers "these views, from the man most often mentioned in U.S. circles as an alternative to Diệm, coming at the end of the visit as they did, must have had an important influence on McNamara's conclusions." The delegation left Saigon to return to Washington at the end of the day.

=== Meetings with Lodge ===
During the briefings that Lodge made to McNamara and Taylor, the ambassador repeated his previously expressed doubts about the potential effectiveness of aid suspension as a lever against Diệm. He also expressed his concern that the foreign aid bill that was being tabled in US Congress could be halted due to negative sentiment over Diệm's repressions of the Buddhists. During the visit, Lodge reiterated in his cables to Washington that he felt that an aid suspension could backfire on the United States by alienating the population as well as the regime. Aware that an aid suspension was a potential recommendation of the mission's report, the USAID director Brent also openly expressed his concerns over such move. Both opinions were regarded as important because McNamara and Taylor had been specifically charged by Kennedy with examining ways to make American aid better facilitate US foreign policy goals objectives. Lodge and Brent tabled papers which included a program-by-program consideration of the impact of an aid suspension.

== Drafting the report ==
After a one-day stopover in Honolulu to prepare their report, McNamara and Taylor arrived back in Washington on October 2. The report was written hurriedly on the plane trip back to Washington. Forrestal described the report as a "mishmash of everything." During the 27-hour flight, Bundy managed only to get two hours of sleep between his writing and later opined that "neither their draftsmanship nor judgment is likely to be at its best under such working conditions. They promptly met with the President and the National Security Council. Their report concluded that the "military campaign has made great progress and continues to progress." On the other hand, it warned that the serious political tensions in Saigon due to the Buddhist crisis and the increasing unpopularity of Diệm and Nhu as a result of their anti-Buddhist activities could stoke the dissent of some ARVN officers and erode what they believed was favourable military progress. Taylor and Maxwell reported to having seen no evidence of a successful coup being prepared, and felt that American pressure would probably only further harden the Ngô family's attitudes. Nevertheless, "unless such pressures are exerted, they [Diệm-Nhu] are almost certain to continue past patterns of behavior."

== Recommendations ==
The military recommendations of the report were that General Harkins should review the military effort with Diệm with an eye toward its successful conclusion in I, II, and III Corps by the end of 1964 and in the IV Corps in the Mekong Delta by the end of 1965. This would necessitate:

1. A shift in military emphasis and strength to the Mekong Delta
2. An increase in the intensity of military activity throughout the country
3. An emphasis on "clear and hold operations"
4. A consolidation of the Strategic Hamlet Program with the emphasis on security;
5. The fleshing out of combat units and better training and arms for the hamlet militia.

The report further proposed that an announcement be made of the planned withdrawal of 1,000 American troops by the end of 1963 in connection with a program to train Vietnamese to replace Americans in all "essential functions" by 1965. It noted mild progress in the war but saw little wisdom in maintaining the present level of US forces. The report concluded that the ARVN must focus on "clear and hold operations" rather than broad sweeps and that an improvement in Vietnamese performance would permit "the bulk of US personnel" to withdraw by the end of 1965.

The report set out three alternative policies: reconciliation with the Diệm regime, "selective pressures" and active promotion of a coup. The second option was the one which the report concluded was the best option. Reconciliation would signify approval of Diệm's repressive policies and alienate the ARVN, while initiating a coup was inadvisable "at the present time" in light of the apparent lack of willingness of the ARVN to act. Thus, the report concluded that the only choice was a program of "selective short-term pressures" that were economic and were conditioned to improving the performance of the regime. In order to exert political pressure on the Diệm regime to end its repressive anti-Buddhist policies, the McNamara Taylor report recommended the following measures:

1. Continued withholding of funds in the Commercial Import Program, but without a public formal announcement
2. Suspension of approval of AID loans for the Saigon-Cholon Waterworks and the Saigon Electric Power Project
3. Suspension of support for Colonel Lê Quang Tung's Army of the Republic of Vietnam Special Forces unless they were transferred to the field under the command of Joint General Staff instead of being used for repressing political dissidents under the direct control of Nhu
4. Maintenance of purely "correct" relations between Lodge and Diệm. Harkins, on the other hand, was to continue meeting Diệm at Gia Long Palace

The report called for scrutiny of the effectiveness of the sanctions, hinting that alternative leadership would have to be explored in the event that Diệm did not improve his performance:

the situation must be closely watched to see what steps Diệm is taking to reduce repressive practices and to improve the effectiveness of the military effort. We should set no fixed criteria, but recognize that we would have to decide in 2-4 months, whether to move to more drastic action or try to carry on with Diệm even if he had not taken significant steps.

The report recommended against active American encouragement of a coup, but it recommended seeking "urgently to identify and build contacts with an alternative leadership if and when it appears". It opined that a successful coup appeared to be unlikely, although the assassination of Diệm or Nhu was possible. Forrestal also noted that the proposed suspension of the US$200,000 monthly salary for the Special Forces would encourage a coup, saying "It was the first sign the generals had . . . that maybe the United States was serious about this".

According to the Pentagon Papers, the report was a "curiously contradictory document". The report was regarded as a compromise between General Taylor and Harkins' optimistic view of the military, McNamara's increasing conviction of the gravity of the political crisis and its potential to derail the anti-communist war effort. The recommendations for aid suspensions and the announcement of US troop withdrawals were designed as measures that would foster doubt within the Diệm regime about American intentions and incentives for policy changes. The fact that such sanctions would be seen by the ARVN generals as a signal of American willingness to accept alternative leadership, in other words, a coup, was not recognized in the recommendation, since the report specifically ruled out American encouragement of "a change of government". This was a notable oversight in view of the ARVN generals' clear statement in August that they regarded an aid suspension as a green light for a coup.

== Implementation ==
The recommendations of the McNamara–Taylor mission were swiftly approved at the NSC meeting on October 2, and later in the day, McNamara made the Presidentially approved media statement that included the announcement of the 1,000 man troop withdrawal by year's end. The press release reiterated America's commitment to the struggle against the Viet Cong insurgency in South Vietnam, stated the progress of the war, announced the troop withdrawal, and dissociated the Kennedy administration from Diệm's anti-Buddhist activities. It avoided any reference to economic aid suspensions or other sanctions against the regime, thereby allowing the Ngô family to change policy without a public loss of face.

On October 5, Kennedy approved the military recommendations of the McNamara-Taylor report, but "directed that no formal announcement be made of the implementation of plans to withdraw 1,000 U.S. military personnel by the end of 1963". The details of how the new policy would be applied were detailed in a lengthy cable to Lodge after this meeting. The objective of the new course of action was described at the beginning:

Actions are designed to indicate to Diệm Government our displeasure at its political policies and activities and to create significant uncertainty in that government and in key Vietnamese groups as to future intentions of United States. At same time, actions are designed to have at most slight impact on military or counterinsurgency effort against Viet Cong, at least in short term.

The recommendations on negotiations are concerned with what U.S. is after, i.e., GVN action to increase effectiveness of its military effort; to ensure popular support to win war; and to eliminate strains on U.S. Government and public confidence. The negotiating posture is designed not to lay down specific hard and fast demands or to set a deadline, but to produce movement in Vietnamese Government along these lines. In this way we can test and probe effectiveness of any actions the GVN actually takes and, at the same time, maintain sufficient flexibility to permit U.S. to resume full support of Diệm regime at any time U.S. Government deems it appropriate.

The cable went on to acknowledge that the proposed sanctions could only be applied for between two and four months before they began to adversely affect the military effort. As a result, it noted that when the negative effects begin to manifest itself that ". . . further major decisions will be required". The specific actions to be implemented as a result of the report included:

1. Suspension of the Commodity Import Program without public declaration
2. Selective suspension of PL 480, on an individual and sometimes monthly basis after referral to Washington for review
3. Suspension of the loans for the Saigon-Cholon Waterworks (US$9m) and the Saigon Electric Power Project (US$4m)
4. Private notification to Saigon that funding of Colonel Tung's Special Forces would be conditional on their commitment to field operations under the command of the Joint General Staff control, again without public announcement.

Lodge was instructed to maintain a strategy of "cool correctness in order to make Diệm come to you", but to be ready to re-establish contact with Gia Long Palace if this strategy did not work. Lodge was specifically told to seek improvements in the ARVN military effort, domestic reforms by Diệm that would restore public belief in the South Vietnamese administration and its image. As a result of the mission and the preceding Krulak Mendenhall mission, the Kennedy administration made a decision that was described in the Pentagon Papers as "a far-reaching decision on American policy toward South Vietnam". The tack of applying positive pressures against an ally to obtain compliance with American policies was taken optimistically given that it was to be led by an ambassador who was "uniquely equipped by background and temperament to make it succeed".
