= Krulak–Mendenhall mission =

US government mission to South Vietnam in 1963

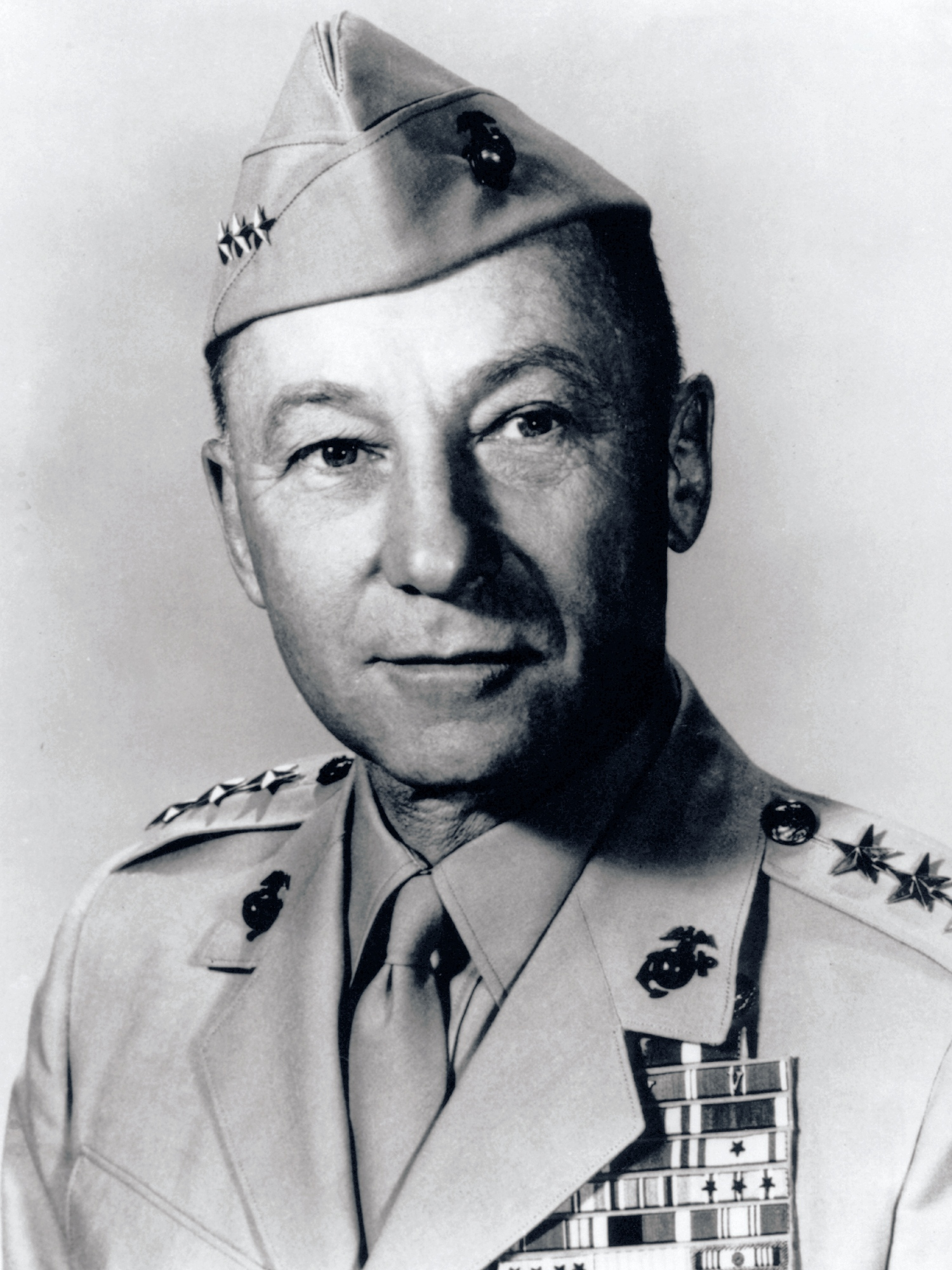
United States Marine Corps General Victor Krulak

The Krulak–Mendenhall mission was a fact-finding expedition dispatched by the Kennedy administration to South Vietnam in early September 1963. The stated purpose of the expedition was to investigate the progress of the war by the South Vietnamese regime and its US military advisers against the Viet Cong insurgency. The mission was led by Victor Krulak and Joseph Mendenhall. Krulak was a major general in the United States Marine Corps, while Mendenhall was a senior Foreign Service Officer experienced in dealing with Vietnamese affairs. Civil unrest gripped South Vietnam as Buddhist demonstrations against the religious discrimination of President Ngô Đình Diệm's Catholic regime escalated. Following the raids on Buddhist pagodas on August 21 that left a death toll ranging up to a few hundred, the US had authorized investigations into a possible coup through a cable to US Ambassador Henry Cabot Lodge Jr.

The four-day whirlwind trip was launched on September 6, 1963, the same day as a National Security Council (NSC) meeting, and came in the wake of increasingly strained relations between the United States and South Vietnam. In their submissions to the NSC, Krulak presented an optimistic report on the progress of the war, while Mendenhall presented a bleak picture of military failure and public discontent. Krulak disregarded the popular support for the Viet Cong, feeling that the Vietnamese soldiers' efforts in the field would not be affected by the public's unease with Diệm's policies. Mendenhall focused on gauging the sentiment of urban Vietnamese and concluded that Diệm's policies increased the possibility of religious civil war, and were causing the South Vietnamese to believe that life under the Viet Cong would improve the quality of their lives. The divergent reports led US president John F. Kennedy to ask his two advisers "You two did visit the same country, didn't you?"

The inconclusive report was the subject of bitter and personal debate among Kennedy's senior advisers. Various courses of action towards Vietnam were discussed, such as fostering a regime change or taking a series of selective measures designed to cripple the influence of Ngô Đình Nhu, Diệm's brother and chief political adviser. Nhu and his wife Madame Ngô Đình Nhu were seen as the major causes of the political problems in South Vietnam. The inconclusive result of Krulak and Mendenhall's expedition resulted in a follow-up mission, the McNamara–Taylor mission.

== Background ==
After the Huế Phật Đản shootings on May 8, civil unrest broke out in South Vietnam. Nine Buddhists were shot by the Roman Catholic regime of President Ngô Đình Diệm after defying a government ban on the flying of Buddhist flags on Vesak, the birthday of Gautama Buddha and marching in an anti-government protest. Following the shootings, Buddhist leaders began to lobby Diệm for religious equality and compensation and justice for the families of the victims. With Diệm remaining recalcitrant, the protests escalated. The self-immolation of Buddhist monk Thích Quảng Đức at a busy Saigon intersection became a public relations disaster for the Diệm regime, as photos of the event made front-page headlines worldwide and became a symbol of Diệm's policies. As protests continued, the Army of the Republic of Vietnam (ARVN) Special Forces loyal to Diệm's brother Ngô Đình Nhu conducted the Xá Lợi Pagoda raids on August 21, leaving a death toll estimated to be up to several hundred and causing extensive damage under the declaration of martial law. Universities and high schools were closed amid mass pro-Buddhist protests. In the meantime, the fight against the Viet Cong insurgency had begun to lose intensity amid rumors of sectarian infighting amongst ARVN troops. This was compounded by the plotting of a coup by various ARVN officers, which distracted attention from the insurgency. After the pagoda raids, the Kennedy administration sent Cable 243 to the US Embassy, Saigon, ordering an exploration of alternative leadership possibilities.

== Initiation and expedition ==
At the end of the National Security Council (NSC) meeting on September 6, it was agreed that the priority was to obtain more information on the situation in Vietnam. US Secretary of Defense Robert McNamara proposed sending Marine Corps Major General Victor Krulak on an immediate fact-finding trip. The NSC agreed that Joseph Mendenhall—a Foreign Service Officer with Vietnam experience—would accompany him and the pair began the mission later that day.

On their return trip to Washington, D.C., Krulak and Mendenhall brought John Mecklin back from Saigon to report. Mecklin was the United States Information Service (USIS) director. The State Department sent the Saigon embassy a detailed cable containing questions about Vietnamese public opinion across all strata of society. In Krulak's words, the objective was to observe "the effect of recent events upon the attitudes of the Vietnamese in general, and upon the war effort against the Viet Cong".

In a four-day trip, the two men traveled throughout Vietnam before returning to Washington to file their reports. Krulak visited 10 locations in all four Corps zones of the ARVN and spoke with US ambassador Henry Cabot Lodge Jr., the head of US forces in Vietnam General Paul Harkins and his staff, 87 US advisors and 22 ARVN officers. Mendenhall went to Saigon, Huế, Da Nang and several other provincial cities, talking primarily to Vietnamese friends. Their estimates of the situation were the opposite. Mecklin wrote afterwards that it "was a remarkable assignment, to travel twenty-four thousand miles and assess a situation as complex as Vietnam and return in just four days. It was a symptom of the state the US Government was in". The mission was marked by the tension between its leaders. Mendenhall and Krulak intensely disliked one another, speaking to each other only when necessary. Mecklin and Krulak became embroiled in a dispute during the return flight. Krulak disapproved of Mecklin's decision to bring television footage that had been censored by the Diệm regime back to the US, believing the action was a violation of sovereignty. After a long and bitter argument aboard the aircraft, Krulak called upon Mecklin to leave the film in Alaska during a refueling stop at Elmendorf Air Force Base, further suggesting that the USIS director remain with the film in Alaska.

== Report and debriefing ==
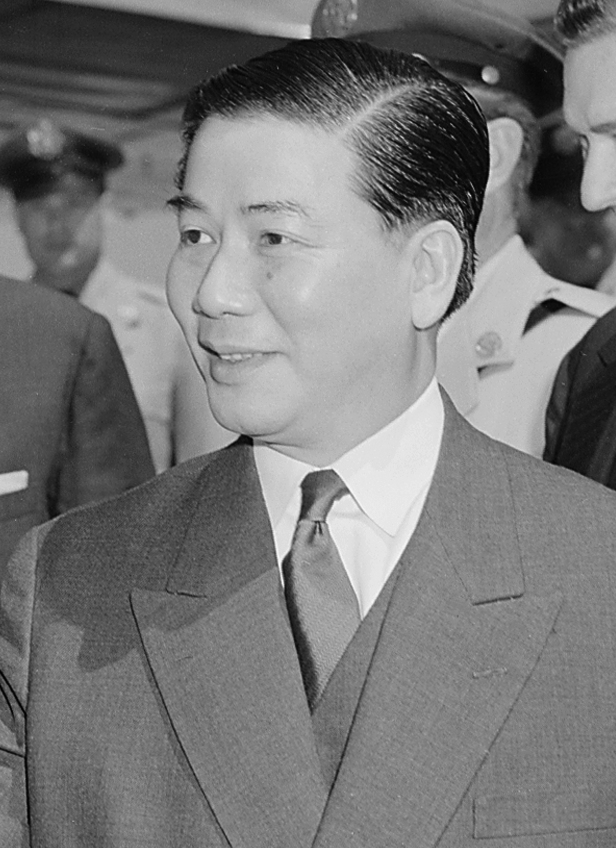
President Ngô Đình Diệm of South Vietnam

The NSC reconvened on the morning of September 10 to hear the delegation's reports. Mendenhall had experience in Vietnamese affairs, having served under the previous US ambassador Elbridge Durbrow. Durbrow had urged Diệm on a number of occasions to implement political reform. Krulak was a Marine known for his belief in using military action to achieve foreign affairs objectives. His temperament earned him the nickname "Brute", which originated from his wrestling career at the Naval Academy. The Deputy Secretary of Defense Roswell Gilpatric noted that Mendenhall was regarded "with great suspicion on the Virginia side of the river [the Pentagon, headquarters of the Defense Department]", whereas Krulak was "universally liked and trusted in the Pentagon, both on the civilian and military side".

The backgrounds of Krulak and Mendenhall were reflected in their opposite analyses of the war. Krulak gave a highly optimistic analysis of military progress and discounted the effect of the Buddhist crisis on the ARVN's fight against the Viet Cong. His conclusion was that "[t]he shooting war is still going ahead at an impressive pace. It has been affected adversely by the political crisis, but the impact is not great."

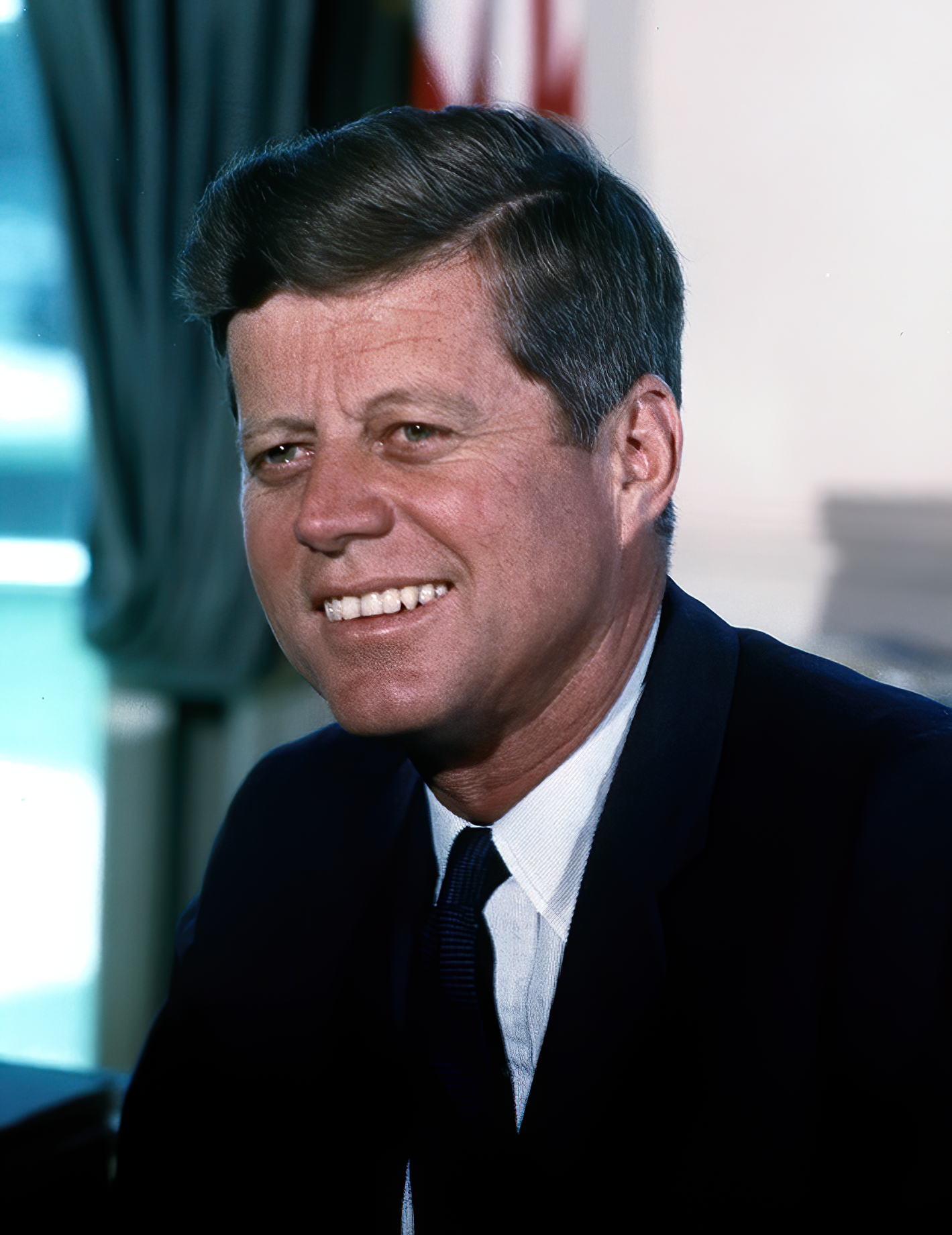
US President John F. Kennedy

Krulak asserted that a substantial amount of fighting was still required, particularly in the Mekong Delta, which was regarded as the Viet Cong's strongest region. Krulak asserted that all levels of the ARVN officer corps were conscious of the Buddhist crisis but he believed that most had not allowed religious beliefs to negatively affect their internal military relationships to a substantial degree. He believed that the ARVN officers were obedient and could be expected to carry out any order they regarded as lawful. Krulak further asserted that the political crisis had not significantly damaged bilateral military ties. Moving along to the Vietnamese view of their leaders, Krulak predicted that there was dissatisfaction among the officers, which he believed was mainly directed at Ngô Đình Nhu, the younger brother of Diệm who was widely seen as the power behind the regime. Krulak believed that most officers wanted to see the back of Nhu but that few were willing to resort to a coup. Krulak reported that three US advisers strongly criticized the Nhus and advocated the pair's departure from South Vietnam to avoid a public relations disaster at the United Nations. Krulak felt that these problems were outweighed by what he believed to be a successful military effort and that the war would be won irrespective of the political leadership. He predicted that the ARVN had little ability to facilitate an improvement in governance and felt that they would not flex whatever muscle they had. Krulak optimistically concluded,

Excluding the very serious political and military factors external to Vietnam, the Viet Cong war will be won if the current US military and sociological programs are pursued, irrespective of the grave defects in the ruling regime.

Mendenhall disagreed and argued that the anti-Diệm sentiment had reached a level where the collapse of civilian rule was possible. He reported a "reign of terror" in Saigon, Huế and Da Nang, observing that the popular hatred usually reserved for the Nhus had spread to the generally respected Diệm. Mendenhall asserted that many Vietnamese had come to believe that life under Diệm worse than being ruled by the Viet Cong. Mendenhall thought that a civil war on religious grounds was possible. He predicted that the war could only be won with a regime change, otherwise South Vietnam would collapse into sectarian infighting or a massive communist offensive. The contradictory nature of the reports prompted Kennedy's famous query, "You two did visit the same country, didn't you?"

=== Debate ===
Krulak attempted to explain the contrasting assessments by pointing out that Mendenhall had surveyed urban areas, while he ventured into the countryside "where the war is". Krulak asserted that political issues in Saigon would not hamper military progress, stating "We can stagger through to win the war with Nhu remaining in control." Assistant Secretary of State Roger Hilsman asserted that the difference between the contrasting reports "was the difference between a military and a political view". During the debate over the differences in outlook, Mendenhall asserted that Saigon had suffered "a virtually complete breakdown" following the pagoda raids. Mendenhall reported that Vietnamese public servants feared being seen with Americans. He recalled one visit when he had to remain quiet while his Vietnamese host crept around the room, searching for hidden microphones. Mendenhall asserted that "Saigon was heavy with an atmosphere of fear and hate" and that the people feared Diệm more than the Viet Cong. He reported many public servants no longer slept at home due to a fear of midnight arrests by Nhu's secret police. Many officials had recently spent the bulk of their day negotiating the release of their children, who had been incarcerated for participating in pro-Buddhist protests. Mendenhall asserted that internal turmoil was now a higher priority than the war against the communists.

Mendenhall denounced Saigon's reconciliation and goodwill gestures towards the Buddhists as a public relations stunt. He reported that monks from provincial areas who had been arrested in Saigon for demonstrating were not returned to their places of origin as promised. Mendenhall noted that when the monks were released, Diệm's officials retained their identification papers. This resulted in their re-arrest upon attempting to leave the capital. The monks were then branded as Viet Cong because they did not have government identification papers. As news of such tactics spread across the capital, some monks sought refuge in the Saigon homes of ARVN officers. Mendenhall insisted that the United States was responsible for the situation because it had helped the Ngo family gain power, armed and funded it. He reasoned that as Diệm used the arms against his own people, Washington also shared responsibility. He stated that "a refusal to act would be just as much interference in Vietnam's affairs as acting".

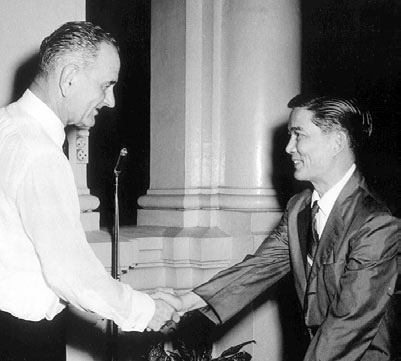
Ngô Đình Nhu (pictured right) meeting US Vice President Lyndon B. Johnson

According to the Pentagon Papers, "the critical failure of both reports was to understand the fundamental political role that the army was coming to play in Vietnam". The papers concluded the ARVN was the only institution capable of deposing and replacing Diệm. Diệm and Nhu fully realized the potential threat, responding with the divide and conquer paradigm. They usurped the prerogative of senior officer promotion and appointed generals based on loyalty to the palace, giving orders directly to officers. This action caused deep distrust among the senior officers and fragmented their power. Krulak failed to realize that if the situation deteriorated to the point where discontent with Diệm posed the possibility of a communist victory, the generals would intervene in politics because of what would happen to them under communist rule. Neither Krulak nor Mendenhall seemed to anticipate that if a military junta came to power, the divisive effect of Diệm's promotion politics would manifest itself as the generals vied for power. Neither of the pair put any emphasis on the detrimental effects that would have been caused by political infighting among the generals.

During the NSC meeting, Frederick Nolting—who preceded Lodge as US Ambassador to South Vietnam—took issue with Mendenhall's analysis. Regarded as a Diệm apologist, Nolting pointed out that Mendenhall had been pessimistic about South Vietnam for several years. Mecklin reinforced and pushed Mendenhall's view further, calling on the administration to apply direct pressure on Saigon by suspending non-military aid, in an attempt to cause a regime change. In Mecklin's words:

This would unavoidably be dangerous. There was no way to be sure how events would develop. It was possible, for example, that the Vietnamese forces might fragment into warring factions, or that the new government would be so incompetent and/or unstable that the effort against the Viet Cong would collapse. The US should therefore resolve now to introduce American combat forces if necessary to prevent a Communist triumph midst the debris of the Diệm regime.

The Pentagon Papers opined that Mecklin understood the pitfalls of a military junta that Krulak and Mendenhall had overlooked. Regardless, Mecklin concluded that the US should proceed in fostering a regime change, accept the consequences, and contemplate the introduction of US combat troops to stop a possible Viet Cong victory.

The NSC meeting then heard Rufus Phillips' bleak prognosis of the situation in the Mekong Delta. Phillips was the director of rural programs for United States Operations Mission (USOM) and an advisor for the Strategic Hamlet Program; he had returned to the US due to his father's terminal illness just days before the Krulak-Mendenhall mission, and was invited to participate in the mission's debrief on the recommendation of reporter Joseph Alsop and NSC staffer Michael Forrestal. He claimed that the Strategic Hamlet Program was a shambles in the delta, stating that they were "being chewed to pieces by the Viet Cong". When it was noted that Phillips had recently witnessed a battle in the delta, Kennedy asked Phillips for his assessment. Phillips replied: "Well, I don't like to contradict General Krulak, but I have to tell you, Mr. President, that we're not winning the war, particularly in the delta. The troops are paralysed, they're in the barracks, and this is what is actually going on in one province that's right next to Saigon." Phillips asserted that removing Nhu was the only way to improve the situation. Phillips asserted that the only means of removing Nhu was to bring in General Edward Lansdale, the CIA operative who had consolidated Diệm's position a decade earlier, a proposal that Kennedy dismissed. Phillips recommended three measures:

- Terminate aid to the ARVN Special Forces of Colonel Lê Quang Tung, who took his orders directly from the palace and not the army command. Tung had led the raids on Buddhist pagodas on August 21 in which hundreds were killed and widespread physical destruction occurred. The Special Forces were used mainly for repressing dissidents rather than fighting communists.
- Cut funds to the Motion Picture Center, which produced hagiographic films about the Nhus.
- Pursue covert actions aimed at dividing and discrediting Tung and Major General Tôn Thất Đính. Dinh was the military governor of Saigon and the Commander of the ARVN III Corps. Dinh was the youngest general in the history of the ARVN, primarily due to his loyalty to the Ngo family.

In the ensuing debate, Kennedy asked Phillips what would happen if Nhu responded to the cuts by diverting money away from the army to prop up his personal schemes. When Kennedy asked if Nhu would blame the US for any resulting military deterioration, Phillips replied that the ARVN would revolt, because the ARVN officers who were on Viet Cong hit lists would not allow the communists to run loose. Phillips said that if Nhu tried to divert military aid away from the troops to prop up his personal schemes, the Americans could deliver the money straight to the countryside in suitcases.

=== Robust disagreement ===
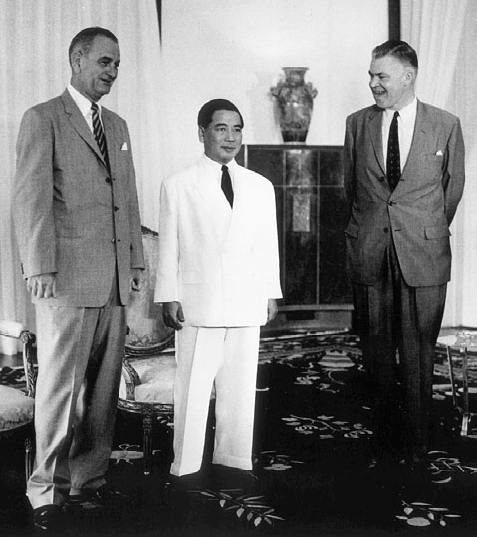
US Vice President Lyndon B. Johnson, RVN president Ngô Đình Diệm and Frederick Nolting in South Vietnam's Presidential Palace in 1961

The meeting became confrontational when Krulak interrupted Phillips, asserting that American military advisers on the ground rejected the USOM officer's assessments. Phillips conceded that although the overall military situation had improved, this was not the case in the crucial delta areas. Phillips noted that the provincial military adviser in Long An Province adjacent to Saigon, had reported that the Viet Cong had overrun 200 Strategic Hamlets in the previous week, forcing the villagers to dismantle the settlement. McNamara shook his head at the radically divergent reports. When Krulak derided Phillips, Assistant Secretary of State W. Averell Harriman could no longer restrain himself and called the general "a damn fool". Phillips diplomatically took over from Harriman and asserted that it was a battle for hearts and minds rather than pure military metrics.

Mecklin generated more disquiet by advocating the use of American combat troops to unseat the Diệm regime and win the war. He asserted that "the time had come for the US to apply direct pressure to bring about a change of government, however distasteful". Mecklin asserted that there would be a backlash if aid was simply cut, so US troops would have to directly fix the problem. Mecklin later wrote to USIS head Edward R. Murrow to insist that US troops would welcome combat in the case of a communist escalation. On the journey back to the United States, he had asserted that the use of American combat forces would encourage the coup and lift morale against the Viet Cong. He also called for the engineering of a coup. He called for the US to show more intent.

The pessimism expressed by Phillips and Mecklin surprised Nolting who said that Phillips' account "surprised the hell out of me. I couldn't believe my ears." Nolting asserted that Mecklin was psychologically vulnerable to being brainwashed because he had recently split with his wife. At the time, Mecklin was living with journalists David Halberstam and Neil Sheehan of The New York Times and UPI respectively. Halberstam and Sheehan both won Pulitzer Prizes and were strident critics of Diệm.

== Aftermath ==
One strategy that received increasing consideration in NSC meetings—as well as at the US Embassy, Saigon and in Congress—was a suspension of non-military aid to Diệm. After the erroneous Voice of America broadcast on August 26, which announced an aid suspension, Lodge was given the discretion on August 29 to suspend aid if it would facilitate a coup. In the meantime, the US Senate began to pressure the administration to take action against Diệm. Hilsman was lobbied by the Senate Subcommittee on the Far East. Senator Frank Church informed the administration of his intention to introduce a resolution condemning Diệm's anti-Buddhist repression and calling for the termination of aid unless religious equality was instituted. This resulted in Church agreeing to temporarily delay the introduction of the bill to avoid embarrassing the administration.

While the delegation was in Vietnam, the strategy of using a selective aid suspension to pressure Diệm into ending religious discrimination was actively discussed at the State Department. In a television interview on September 8, AID Director David Bell warned that Congress might cut aid to South Vietnam if Diệm did not change his policies. On September 9, Kennedy backed away from Bell's comments, stating "I don't think we think that [a reduction in aid to Saigon] would be helpful at this time." On September 11, the day after Krulak and Mendenhall tabled their reports, Lodge reversed his position. In a long cable to Washington, he advocated the consideration of using non-military aid suspension to spark the toppling of Diệm. Lodge concluded that the US could not get what it wanted from Diệm, and had to force events to come to a head. After another White House meeting on the same day, Senator Church was informed that his bill was acceptable, so he introduced the legislation into the Senate.

The National Security Council re-convened on September 17 to consider two of Hilsman's proposals for dealing with Diệm. The plan favored by Hilsman and his State Department colleagues was the "pressures and persuasion track". This involved an escalating series of measures at both public and private level, including selective aid suspension and pressuring Diệm to remove Nhu from power. The alternative was the "reconciliation with a rehabilitated GVN track", which involved the public appearance of acquiescence to Diệm's recent actions and an attempt to salvage as much as possible from the situation. Both proposals assumed that an ARVN coup was not forthcoming. The inconclusive report saw a follow-up mission sent to Vietnam, the McNamara–Taylor mission, led by McNamara and Chairman of the Joint Chiefs of Staff Maxwell D. Taylor.

== See also ==
- Rufus Phillips § Krulak-Mendenhall mission
