= Edward Lansdale =

United States Air Force and CIA officer

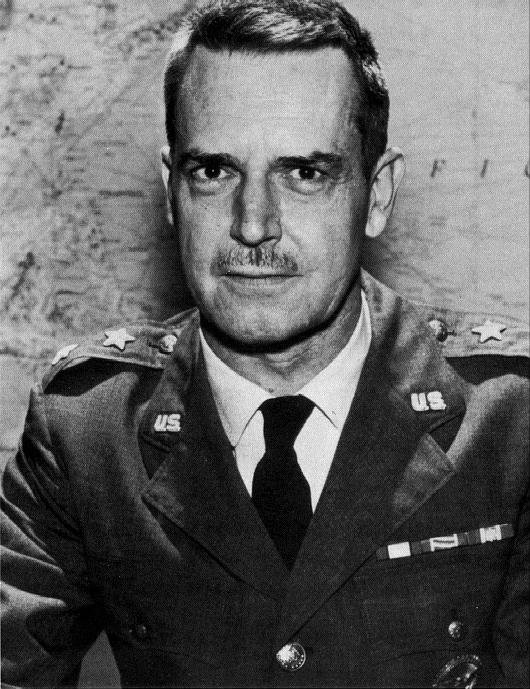
- Lansdale in 1963
- Born: Edward Geary Lansdale; February 6, 1908; Detroit, Michigan, U.S.
- Died: February 23, 1987 (aged 79); McLean, Virginia, U.S.
- Spouse(s): Helen Batcheller (m. 1933–1972); Patrocini[a] Yapcinco (m. 1973–1987)
- Children: 2
- Military career
- Allegiance: United States
- Branch: United States Army; United States Air Force
- Service years: 1941–1947 (Army); 1947–1963 (USAF)
- Rank: Major (USA); Major General (USAF)
- Conflicts: World War II; Hukbalahap rebellion; Kamlon rebellion; First Indochina War; Vietnam War; Operation Mongoose
- Awards: Distinguished Service Medal; National Security Medal; Philippine Legion of Honor; Philippine Military Merit Medal

Edward Geary Lansdale (February 6, 1908 – February 23, 1987) was a United States Air Force officer until retiring in 1963 as a major general before continuing his work with the Central Intelligence Agency (CIA). Lansdale was a pioneer in clandestine operations and psychological warfare. In the early 1950s, Lansdale played a significant role in suppressing the Hukbalahap rebellion in the Philippines. In 1954, he moved to Saigon and started the Saigon Military Mission, a covert intelligence operation that was created to sow dissension in North Vietnam. Lansdale believed the United States could win guerrilla wars by studying the enemy's psychology, an approach that notionally won the approval of the presidential administrations of both John F. Kennedy and Lyndon B. Johnson but largely would not be implemented due to bureaucratic opposition.

== Early life ==
Lansdale was born in Detroit, Michigan, on February 6, 1908, and later raised in Los Angeles. He was the second of four sons of Sarah Frances (née Philips; 1881–1954) and Henry Lansdale (1883–1959). Lansdale attended school in Michigan, New York, and California before attending the University of California, Los Angeles (UCLA) where he earned his way largely by writing for newspapers and magazines. Lansdale struggled in learning foreign languages while at UCLA and told a biographer he retained almost nothing except Spanish curse words and French phrases he had memorized in kindergarten. Lansdale's difficulty in meeting the foreign language requirement for his degree and his lack of an obvious career path prompted him to drop out of UCLA several credits short of graduation. He later moved on to better-paying work in advertising in Los Angeles and San Francisco.

Lansdale pursued a career in advertising. He worked for Silverwood's, a men's clothing retail firm. In his counter-insurgency efforts later on, he would apply principles and concepts that he had learned while he worked in the advertising industry.

== Career ==
=== Philippines ===
Lansdale entered the U.S. Army in 1941 and served with both the Military Intelligence Service and Office of Strategic Services during World War II, ultimately being promoted to major. He extended his tour to remain in the Philippines until 1948, helping the Philippine Army rebuild its intelligence services and resolve the cases of large numbers of prisoners of war. With most of Lansdale's prior United States Army intelligence officer experience being with US Army Air Forces units, he transferred to the US Air Force and was commissioned as a captain when it was established as an independent service in 1947. After leaving the Philippines in 1948, he served as an instructor at the Strategic Intelligence School at Lowry Air Force Base, Colorado, where he received a temporary promotion to lieutenant colonel in 1949.

In 1950, President Elpidio Quirino personally requested that Lansdale be transferred to the Joint US Military Assistance Group, Philippines, to assist the intelligence services of the Armed Forces of the Philippines in combating the Hukbalahap rebellion. Lansdale was an early practitioner of psychological warfare. Adopting a tactic previously used in the Philippines by the Imperial Japanese Army during World War II, Lansdale spread rumors that aswangs, blood-sucking demons in Philippine folklore, were loose in the jungle. His men then captured an enemy soldier and drained the blood from his body, leaving the corpse where it could be seen and making the Hukbalahap flee the region. Lansdale also arranged for US military support to Philippine efforts in defeating the Kamlon rebellion in Sulu.

Lansdale became friends with Ramon Magsaysay, then the secretary of national defense, and with his help, Magsaysay eventually became President of the Philippines on December 30, 1953. Lansdale is said to have run Magsaysay's campaign for the Central Intelligence Agency (CIA) in the 1953 Philippine general election. Lansdale helped the Philippine Armed Forces develop psychological operations, civic actions, and the rehabilitation of Hukbalahap prisoners.

=== Vietnam ===
==== 1950s ====
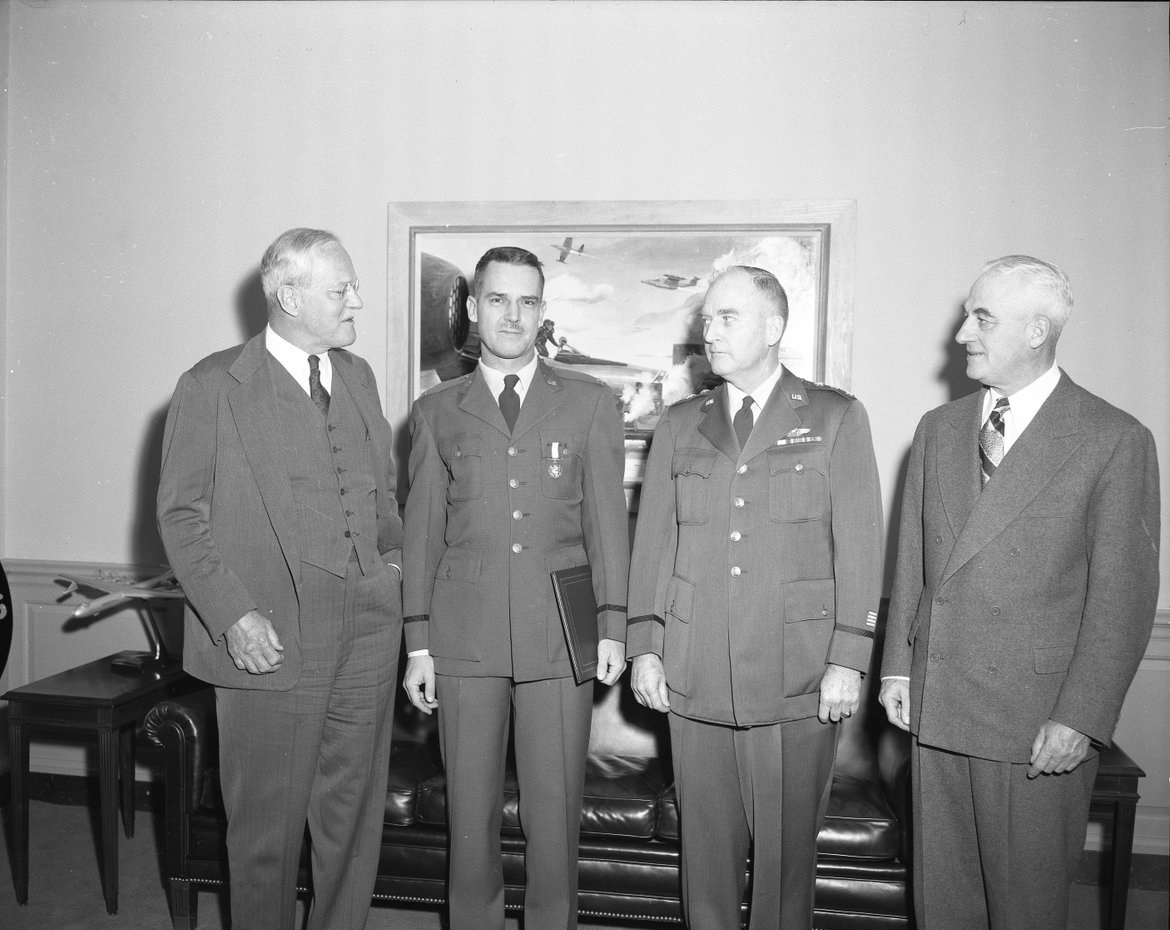
Lansdale with CIA Director Allen Dulles and United States Air Force Chief of Staff General Nathan F. Twining and CIA Deputy Director Lieutenant General Charles P. Cabell at the Pentagon in 1955.

After the end of the left-wing Huk insurgency in the Philippines and after building support for Magsaysay's presidency, CIA director Allen Dulles instructed Lansdale to "do what you did in the Philippines [in Vietnam]. Lansdale had previously been a member of General John W. O'Daniel's mission to Indochina in 1953, acting as an advisor to French forces on special counter-guerrilla operations against the Viet Minh. From 1954 to 1957, he was stationed in Saigon as the head of the Saigon Military Mission. During this period, he was active in the training of the Vietnamese National Army (VNA), organizing the Caodaist militias under Trình Minh Thế in an attempt to bolster the VNA, initiated a propaganda campaign encouraging Vietnam's Catholics to move to the south as part of Operation Passage to Freedom, and spreading claims that North Vietnamese agents were making attacks in South Vietnam.

Operation Passage to Freedom changed the religious balance in Vietnam. Before the war, the majority of Vietnamese Catholics lived in North Vietnam, but after the operation the South held the majority, 55% of whom were refugees from the North. Lansdale accomplished that by dropping leaflets in the Northern hamlets stating that "Christ has gone to the South" and other leaflets showing maps with concentric circles emanating from Hanoi suggesting an imminent nuclear bomb strike on the Northern capital.

During his time in Vietnam, Lansdale quickly ingratiated himself with Ngô Đình Diệm, the leader of South Vietnam. Diem, typically suspicious of anyone not in his immediate family, invited Lansdale to move into the presidential palace after which they became friends. In October 1954, Lansdale foiled a coup attempt, cutting General Nguyễn Văn Hinh's communication off from his top lieutenants by moving them to Manila.

CIA advisor Rufus Phillips was a protege of Lansdale's, and would later maintain that the Viet Minh had largely been defeated in the South by 1956 via Lansdale's civic action programs, but the U.S. bureaucracies subsequently squandered the victory with inappropriate policies and advice. Lucien Conein, who would be instrumental in the 1963 overthrow of Diệm, was another subordinate of Lansdale's.

Around this time Lansdale met a Communist spy, Phạm Xuân Ẩn, who was working in a staff office of the Vietnamese National Army. Ẩn made a good impression, and Lansdale offered to send Ẩn to a US Army school to be trained in intelligence and psychological warfare. Ẩn's superiors in the Communist spy ring thought that would be too dangerous, but Lansdale then helped Ẩn arrange to go to the United States to study journalism at a civilian institution.

==== 1960s ====
In early 1961 he became the Assistant to the Secretary of Defense for Special Operations, and he briefed Secretary of Defense Robert McNamara on the nature of the war in Vietnam. He showed McNamara examples of primitive homemade Viet Cong weaponry, and explained that the war was more a political war than military. He said "It doesn't take weapons and uniforms and lots of food to win. It takes ideas and ideals." After 10 minutes, McNamara abruptly ended the briefing with the words "Is that all?"

Also in 1961, Lansdale helped to publicize the story of Father Nguyễn Lạc Hoá, the "fighting priest" who had organized a crack militia, the Sea Swallows, from his village of anticommunist Chinese Catholic exiles. Lansdale recruited John M. Deutch to his first job in government, working as one of Robert McNamara's "Whiz Kids". Deutch would go on to become the Director of Central Intelligence for the CIA.

In October 1961 President Kennedy sent Lansdale on a fact-finding mission to Vietnam headed by General Maxwell Taylor and Walt Rostow.

In an early 1962 conversation between Lansdale and McNamara, he reportedly told McNamara, who was trying to develop a list of metrics to allow him to scientifically follow the progress of the war, that he needed to add an 'x-factor'; McNamara wrote that down on his list in pencil and asked what it was. Lansdale told him it was the feelings of the common rural Vietnamese people. McNamara then erased it and sarcastically told Lansdale that he could not measure it.

Rufus Phillips had a confrontation with former Ambassador to South Vietnam Frederick Nolting in late September or early October 1963, following the Krulak–Mendenhall mission:

He [Nolting] had been surprised by what I had said at the first meeting at the White House and thought my opinions that we were losing the war unwarranted. I didn’t think I had gone that far. He said, "You just ruined it." I replied, "No, you ruined it by not getting Lansdale out there when it would have done some good." We glared at each other for a moment. He had clearly not understood that I wanted to save Diem but also to tell the truth about Vietnamese reality. Afterward I felt a sense of regret. He had tried mightily to do the right thing, yet he had not understood his personal limitations or those imposed by the formality of his position [i.e., the fact that the South Vietnamese for cultural reasons would not tell the truth about their difficulties unless it was done in private informal settings with Americans whom they had developed a personal level of trust].

According to Daniel Ellsberg, Lansdale was ordered in late September or early October 1963 to McNamara's office. The two went to McNamara's limo and drove to the White House and met with President Kennedy. Kennedy wanted to send him to Vietnam due to his ability to reason with Diệm, but he wanted to know if Lansdale would support removing Diệm from office if it became necessary. Lansdale said no, that Diệm was his friend (Lansdale also believed that replacing Diệm would lead to disaster). Kennedy seemed to understand and didn't show any disappointment, but in the limo McNamara was furious: "You don't talk to the president of the United States that way. When he asks you to do something, you don't tell him you won't do it." (Note: Max Boot wrote that Daniel Ellsberg, a known tall tale teller, is the only source of this story, and the White House visitor log has no record of this meeting, though it is consistent with the other events of this time.) Lansdale was ordered to retire from the Air Force by the end of October. During Lansdale's 31 October 1963 retirement reception Defense Secretary McNamara walked through the room and never looked at Lansdale. Diệm would be assassinated the next day.

From 1965 to 1968, he was back in Vietnam where he worked in the United States Embassy, Saigon, with the rank of minister. The scope of his delegated authority was vague, however, and he was bureaucratically marginalized and frustrated by Philip Habib and Barry Zorthian among others.

Lansdale during this time served in Vietnam with a young Daniel Ellsberg who would work in the U.S. Embassy there. Also during this time Lucien Conein would get drunk in Saigon with Lansdale; Lansdale said of Conein, "He tearfully asked me to forgive him for the Diệm action." (Note: On the day of Diệm's assassination CIA operative Lucien Conein met with Rufus Phillips, who described Conein's demeanor as "ashen," "sick," and a "towering rage.")

=== Anti-Castro campaign ===
From 1957 to 1963, Lansdale worked for the Department of Defense in Washington, serving as Deputy Assistant Secretary for Special Operations, Staff Member of the President's Committee on Military Assistance, and Assistant Secretary of Defense for Special Operations. During the early 1960s, he was chiefly involved in clandestine efforts to topple the government of Cuba, including proposals to assassinate Fidel Castro. Much of this work was under the aegis of "Operation Mongoose," which was the operational name for the CIA plan to topple Castro's government.

Encouraged by the successes that he had in the Philippines with psychological operations, Lansdale drafted a number of proposals along similar lines for Cuba. One suggestion, originated in October 1962, suggested firing “star shells from a submarine to illuminate the Havana area" at night on 2 November, All Soul's Day, in order "to gain extra impact from Cuban superstitions." Simultaneously, he suggested spreading "rumor inside Cuba, about portents signifying the downfall of the regime and the growing strength of the resistance."

== Retirement ==
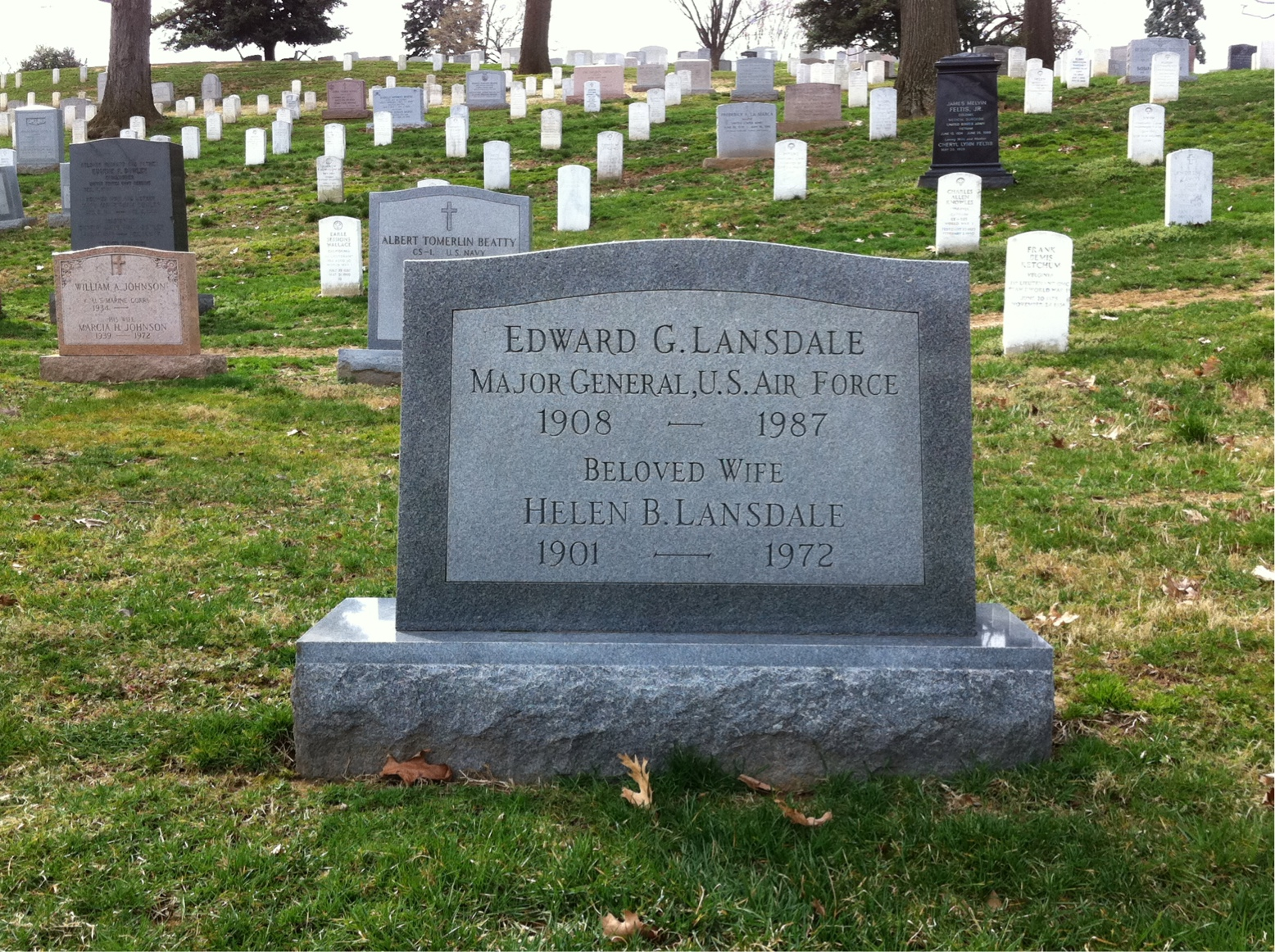
Grave at Arlington National Cemetery

His 1972 memoir, In the Midst of Wars. An American's Mission to Southeast Asia, covered his time in the Philippines and Vietnam up to December 1956.

In 1975 he was called before the Church Committee to testify on plots to kill Castro.

Lansdale's biography, The Unquiet American, was written by Cecil Currey and published in 1988; the title refers to the common, but incorrect, belief that the eponymous character in Graham Greene's novel The Quiet American was based on Lansdale. According to Norman Sherry's authorized biography of Greene, Lansdale did not officially enter the Vietnam arena until 1954, while Greene wrote his book in 1952 after departing Vietnam. It is more likely that he was the inspiration for the character Colonel Hillandale in Eugene Burdick's and William Lederer's joint novel The Ugly American published in 1958.

Many of Lansdale's private papers and effects were destroyed in a fire at his McLean home in 1972. In 1981, Lansdale donated most of his remaining papers to Stanford University's Hoover Institution.

=== JFK film ===
In Oliver Stone's 1991 film JFK, the "General Y" shown as organizing the assassination of President Kennedy was unmistakably Lansdale. Historian Max Boot was highly critical of the General Y story:

Lansdale ... was a critic, not an advocate, of the Americanization of the Vietnam War. He was never a proponent of expensive weapons systems; he argued that the best weapon was a well-trained soldier, diplomat, or spy who would deal sympathetically with the local populace. ... A staunch advocate of spreading liberty abroad, Lansdale was scarcely likely to undermine liberty at home by participating in a military coup d'état against the lawfully elected president—a man he had worked for and respected, even if he was less enamored of the president's younger brother. ... Far from plotting to kill John F. Kennedy, as numerous conspiracy-mongers continue to allege, Lansdale was as grief-stricken as the rest of the country by his shocking death and as uncertain about what would come next.

== Personal life ==
Lansdale died of a heart ailment in his sleep on February 23, 1987. He is buried at Arlington National Cemetery. He was twice married and had two sons from his first marriage.

== Works ==
=== Books ===
- Lansdale, Edward (1991). In the Midst of Wars: An American's Mission to Southeast Asia. Foreword by William E. Colby. New York: Fordham University Press. ISBN 978-0823213146.

=== Correspondence ===
- Memo to Wesley R. Fishel (Sep. 6, 1955).
- Memo to Wesley R. Fishel (Dec. 19, 1954).
- Letter to Wesley R. Fishel (May 1, 1961).

== See also ==
- McNamara fallacy § 1962 meeting with Edward Lansdale
- The Best and the Brightest § Edward Lansdale
