= Rufus Phillips =

CIA and USAID officer (1929–2021)

Rufus Colfax Phillips III
- Born: August 10, 1929; Middletown, Ohio
- Died: December 29, 2021 (aged 92); Arlington, Virginia
- Education: Yale University

Rufus Colfax Phillips III (August 10, 1929 – December 29, 2021) was an American writer, businessman, politician, and Central Intelligence Agency and United States Agency for International Development employee. He became known for his honest reports from Vietnam.

== Early life ==
Phillips was born in Middletown, Ohio and was raised in rural Charlotte County, Virginia. He attended Woodberry Forest School and then Yale College from 1947 to 1951.

== Indochina service 1954-1959 ==
Philips was a Central Intelligence Agency officer beginning in 1952. In 1953, he joined the United States Army and became an officer and finished Jump School. He served briefly in South Korea; he then in 1954 became a military advisor to the South Vietnam government as a protégé of then Colonel Edward Lansdale, specializing in military Civic Action. Initially Lansdale and Philips served in a joint American-French military training group called the Training Relations Instruction Mission (TRIM).

=== Conflict with French military ===
In 1955 a bombing campaign began which targeted U.S. vehicles and a United States Information Agency library in Saigon. CIA operative Lucien Conein was a housemate of Philips who discovered that the bombing was orchestrated by the French chief of staff of TRIM. Philips arrived home to find Conein slicing blocks of C-3 plastic explosive and attaching detonating cords to the thin slices. Philips asked if he could help, Conein put him to work making the small bombs but refused further help. Conein then drove around Saigon at night with his fiancee and threw the bombs in the yards of leading French officials. That night also saw Vietnamese police arrest junior French officers in a jeep with explosives and a list of American targets. The bombings of American assets stopped.

Also that year Philips was the only American at a French social event at which anti-American sentiments were expressed. Philips responded “We don’t pretend to know everything there is to know about Vietnam or that we are always right, but we do listen to the Vietnamese. What they want above all is true independence, which you failed to give them. Why are you still unwilling to see them be independent? And more than that, how can you ever justify in 1946 helping the communists hunt down and kill anticommunist Vietnamese nationalists? Tell me about that.” He saw the French reactions to these charges varied between guilt and hatred.

=== Squandered victory ===
Philips would later maintain that the Viet Minh were largely defeated in the South by 1956 through the military civic action programs, but then the U.S. government bureaucracies misapplied their Korean War experience and so created a power vacuum by pressuring the South Vietnamese to:

1. Abandon civic action programs and reorientate their military to counter a conventional invasion from North Vietnam (mistaking this as the greater threat, and mistaking the guerrilla warfare of Vietnam which had local support of guerrillas for the guerrilla warfare of Korea in which guerrillas did not have local support);
2. Institute police forces modeled on American police, which were incapable of providing rural security against guerrilla warfare (ironically the Philippine Constabulary, which was a U.S. creation, would have been a better model); and
3. Restore rural development responsibilities to the corrupt and inefficient French-appointed civilian bureaucracy, which caused many of the promises made during the civic action campaign to go unrealized.

In addition, the U.S. failed by not pressuring the South Vietnamese to counter the rise of authoritarianism. During the 1954-1956 civil action campaign South Vietnamese president Ngô Đình Diệm had conducted himself as an exemplary democrat, albeit under U.S. pressure, but in mid-1956 his brother Ngô Đình Nhu began to implement authoritarian policies throughout the society and military. The early U.S. advisors including Philips understood this would alienate many anti-Communists, but Philips left Vietnam after this began and little effort was made to counter it. For all these reasons by 1959 the gains of 1954-1956 were lost.

=== Laos and CIA headquarters ===
Phillips then shifted to Laos in April 1957. Phillips left the military in 1956 and the CIA in 1959; he liked the CIA nation building work more than pure intelligence gathering but disliked the bureaucracy of CIA headquarters, where he briefly ran the Laos desk. He was angered by the arrogance of some in the Agency who looked on the Vietnamese as pawns.

== Business and personal activities (1959-1962) ==
From the end of 1959 to mid-1962 Phillips worked with his father's company, Airways Engineering, designing airports around the world. He married Barbara Hubner in May 1960; their children Rufus and Anne would be born in 1961 and 1962.

== Return to Vietnam (1962-1963) ==
Phillips participated in the April 1962 RAND Counterinsurgency Symposium alongside other counterinsurgency experts such as Wendell Fertig, David Galula, Frank Kitson, Edward Lansdale, and Samuel V. Wilson.

Phillips returned to Vietnam with his family after May 1962 as a USAID official supporting the Strategic Hamlet Program. He was one of the architects of the Chieu Hoi program to persuade Vietcong fighters to defect.

=== Krulak-Mendenhall mission ===
In early September 1963 Secretary of Defense Robert McNamara recommended Marine Major General Victor Krulak be sent on a four-day fact-finding mission; State Department official Joseph Mendenhall was also assigned to the trip. Phillips had returned to the U.S. due to his father's terminal illness just days before the Krulak-Mendenhall mission returned. (Note: David Halberstam's account of Phillips' return in The Best and the Brightest was misinformed, see The Best and the Brightest § Errata)

Krulak's and Mendenhall's divergent reports (Krulak stated the war was being won, Mendenhall strongly disagreed) led President Kennedy to ask them "You two did visit the same country, didn't you?" Phillips had been asked to attend this White House meeting, and he gave testimony on his recent experience in Vietnam, stating that 60 hamlets in the Mekong Delta had been overrun by the Viet Cong in the past month. McNamara and Krulak alleged he was not telling the truth (McNamara would later claim that Phillips had reported that 60% of hamlets had been overrun in an attempt to discredit Phillips). David Halberstam would write “Now, coming before the President, he [Phillips] was admitting the failures of his own program, in itself a remarkable moment in the American bureaucracy, a moment of intellectual honesty.” (Note: Halberstam's quote citing Phillips' honesty would appear in Phillips' obituary.) Phillips later wrote that Krulak's and Mendenhall's criticisms of each other were fairly accurate. Krulak did whitewash the military situation, especially in the Mekong Delta, while Mendenhall's urban contacts' pessimism was not reflective of the rural situation elsewhere in the country. Phillips walked away from this and subsequent meetings thinking that only President Kennedy seemed to show any interest in learning about Vietnam, and that all the other principals were motivated only by pride and bureaucratic loyalty.

After his last high level meeting he had a confrontation with former Ambassador to South Vietnam Frederick Nolting:

He had been surprised by what I had said at the first meeting at the White House and thought my opinions that we were losing the war unwarranted. I didn’t think I had gone that far. He said, “You just ruined it.” I replied, “No, you ruined it by not getting Lansdale out there when it would have done some good.” We glared at each other for a moment. He had clearly not understood that I wanted to save Diem but also to tell the truth about Vietnamese reality. Afterward I felt a sense of regret. He had tried mightily to do the right thing, yet he had not understood his personal limitations or those imposed by the formality of his position [i.e., the fact that the South Vietnamese for cultural reasons would not tell the truth about their difficulties unless it was done in private informal settings with Americans whom they had developed a personal level of trust].

Phillips felt that his time was wasted at these meetings - no one asked him anything about Vietnam - and asked Assistant Secretary of State Roger Hilsman to not include him.

=== Mission aftermath ===
After Phillips returned to Saigon to move his family back to the U.S. he discovered major bureaucratic infighting had occurred as a result of his testimony to President Kennedy, including that his family had been targeted. The military advisors were ordered to not talk to his USAID subordinates, and one advisor (the one who confirmed the 60 hamlets overrun account) was reprimanded. General Paul Harkins had said publicly that he would "get" Phillips. Likewise, some of the CIA staff at the embassy stopped working with his subordinates. The CIA station chief, John Richardson, had tried to intimidate his wife Barbara with an allegation that she had overheard information for which she had not been cleared; she was able to deflect the allegation. A few days later the wife of one of Richardson's subordinates tried unsuccessfully to get Barbara Phillips to admit she knew of classified matters. The police guard at his home had been changed, raising the possibility that Ngô Đình Nhu might have planned some kind of retribution, so he arranged for Filipino military friends to move in with their weapons.

Phillips met with President Ngô Đình Diệm two days before the coup that would depose him; Diệm asked if there was to be a coup and Phillips regretfully told him the truth. Phillips met with Lucien Conein hours after the assassination of Diệm and Nhu (Conein had been the liaison between Ambassador Henry Cabot Lodge Jr. and the ARVN generals who executed the coup); he described Conein's demeanor as "ashen," "sick," and a "towering rage" over the deaths.

== Post-government activities ==
Phillips left USAID as an employee in November 1963 and returned to Airways Engineering, but he continued to occasionally visit South Vietnam as an USAID consultant through 1968. He supported South Vietnamese independence and their fight against the Viet Cong but saw the large U.S. military intervention as sabotaging the nation building needed for victory. He rendered testimony to the platform committee of the 1968 Democratic National Convention, where he was disappointed to see the committee wanted to abandon South Vietnam.

Phillips lived in Fairfax County, Virginia. He served on the Fairfax County Board of Supervisors and was a Democrat. He ran for the United States House of Representatives in 1974, and lost the primary election.

Phillips was a contributor to Prelude to Tragedy: Vietnam, 1960-1965 (2000), and the author of Why Vietnam Matters: An Eyewitness Account of Lessons Not Learned (2008). He was a regular guest on The John Batchelor Show and discussed topics on the wars in Iraq and Afghanistan.

Phillips helped monitor the 2009 Afghan elections. He also provided counterinsurgency advice to the U.S. embassy in Kabul. He was inducted into the U.S. Army OCS Hall of Fame in 2014 and appeared in Ken Burns' 2017 documentary film series, The Vietnam War.

== Awards ==
Phillips was awarded the CIA Intelligence Medal of Merit for his 1950s work in Vietnam.

== Works ==
- Rufus Phillips (2000). "TBD". Prelude to Tragedy: Vietnam, 1960-1965. By Neese, Harvey C. Naval Institute Press. ISBN 978-1557504913.
- Phillips, Rufus (2008). Why Vietnam Matters: An Eyewitness Account of Lessons Not Learned. Naval Institute Press. ISBN 9781682473108. OCLC 992225373.
