= Taylor–Rostow Report =

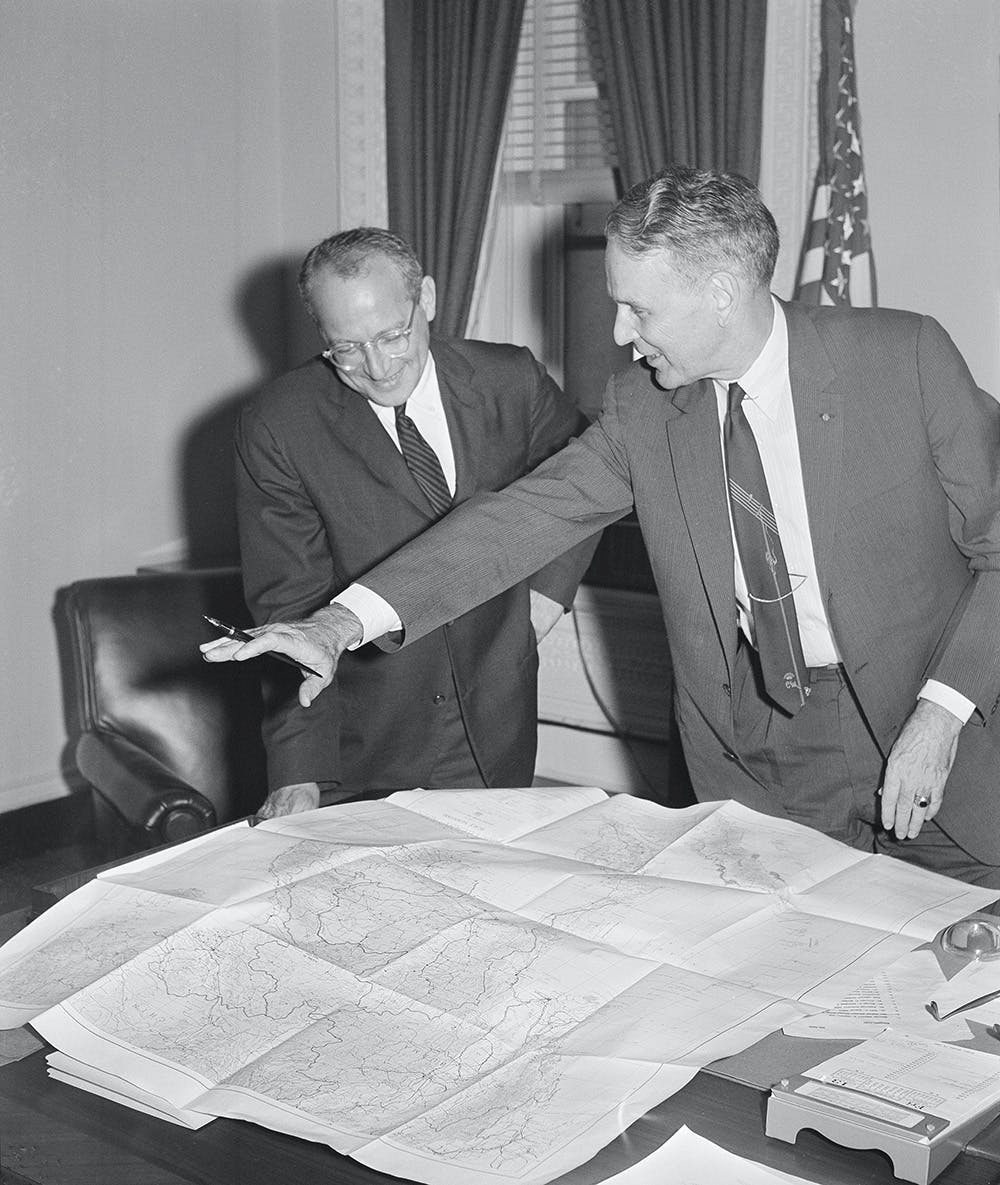
Walt Rostow (l) and Maxwell Taylor (r) preparing for mission to Vietnam, October 1961

The Taylor–Rostow Report was a report prepared in November 1961 on the situation in Vietnam in relation to Vietcong operations in South Vietnam. The report was written by General Maxwell Taylor, military representative to President John F. Kennedy, and Deputy National Security Advisor W.W. Rostow. Kennedy sent Taylor and Rostow to Vietnam in October 1961 to assess the deterioration of South Vietnam’s military position and the government's morale. The report called for improved training of Army of the Republic of Vietnam (ARVN) troops, an infusion of American personnel into the South Vietnamese government and army, greater use of helicopters in counterinsurgency missions against North Vietnamese communists, consideration of bombing the North, and the commitment of 6,000–8,000 U.S. combat troops to Vietnam, albeit initially in a logistical role. The document was significant in that it seriously escalated the Kennedy Administration's commitment to Vietnam. It was also seen historically as having misdiagnosed the root of the Vietnam conflict as primarily a military rather than a political problem.

== Background ==
In early 1961, the new Kennedy Administration faced several foreign policy crises, including the communist insurgencies in Laos and Vietnam. It began to develop potential responses to them and then, slowly, to implement them throughout the year. From January through May it negotiated with South Vietnam and finally agreed to fund increases in the size of the South Vietnamese military. In March, Kennedy decided to pursue multi-national negotiations to try to resolve the Laos crisis, but they would extend into 1962 and leave the situation there uncertain. In April and May, the Administration considered but rejected recommendations by Defense Department and State Department officials and the Joint Chiefs of Staff to commit U.S. combat forces to Vietnam, although it did agree to send another hundred U.S. military advisers, bringing the total up to nearly 800, as well as a 400-man special forces group. In May, during a visit to Vietnam by Vice President Lyndon Johnson, South Vietnamese President Ngô Đình Diệm declined an offer of a defense treaty with the United States, likely for political reasons. In August, after another mission to Vietnam, the United States agreed to fund a further increase of 30,000 men in the Vietnamese military.

In September, the administration received reports of the deterioration of South Vietnam’s military position and the very substantial deterioration of morale in Saigon. There was a sharp upswing in Viet Cong attacks and at the end of the month, Diệm surprised U.S. Ambassador Frederick Nolting by asking him for a defense treaty with the United States. Diệm asserted that the government’s loss of morale was due to worries about U.S. policy on the Laos crisis. But most U.S. officials in Washington, and South Vietnamese other than those closest to Diem, thought it was mostly due to problems within South Vietnam, exacerbated by uncertainties about the U.S. commitment to that country. In response to these developments and upon receiving further proposals for military intervention in Laos and Vietnam, President Kennedy sent Taylor and Rostow, accompanied by other officials from Defense and State, to Vietnam on a fact-finding trip in October.

== Mission to Vietnam ==
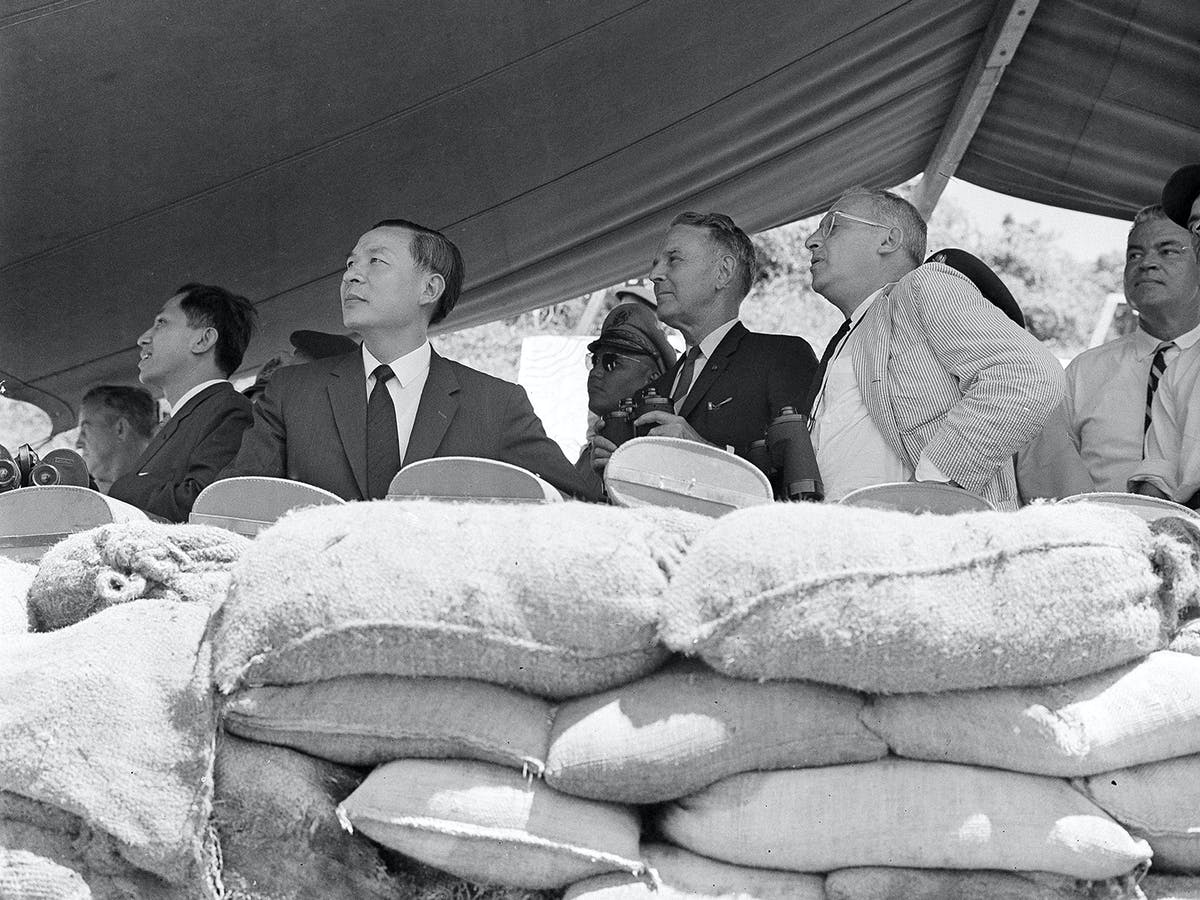
Taylor (center) and Rostow (right) in South Vietnam with Nguyễn Đình Thuận (left front)

The decision to send Taylor and Rostow to Vietnam arose out of, and the agenda for their trip was set in, a National Security Council meeting on October 11. Their mission was to look into the feasibility of the following plans, from both political and military standpoints:

1. a plan for military intervention, drafted by Deputy Under Secretary of State U. Alexis Johnson and based mostly on an earlier Joint Chiefs proposal, that would include up to three divisions of U.S. troops;
2. an alternative plan for stationing fewer U.S. forces in Vietnam, with a more limited objective than defeating the Viet Cong, such forces probably to go in at Da Nang and possibly another South Vietnamese port, principally for the purpose of establishing a U.S. “presence” in Vietnam;
3. other alternatives to sending U.S. combat forces to Vietnam, e.g., stepping up U.S. assistance and training of Vietnamese units and furnishing more U.S. equipment, particularly helicopters and other light aircraft, trucks and other ground transport.

In addition to Taylor and Rostow, the mission included: Air Force Brigadier General Edward Lansdale, Army Brigadier General William Craig, Navy Rear Admiral Luther Heinz, Sterling Cottrell (State), William Jorden (State), David R. Smith (CIA), James Howe (Agency for International Development), George Rathjens and William Godel (Advanced Research Projects Agency), and five other military officers. Lansdale was a somewhat controversial expert on unconventional warfare. The year before he had written a critical and pessimistic report on U.S. policy in Vietnam that had impressed Rostow and President Kennedy. At the time of the Taylor-Rostow mission, he was Assistant for Special Operations to Secretary of Defense Robert McNamara and maintained close relations with Diệm, which he had developed during his time in Vietnam in the 1950s.

The party was in Vietnam from October 18–24. They met with Diệm, Secretary of State and acting Defense Minister Nguyễn Đình Thuận, the senior commanders of the ARVN: Lieutenant General Lê Văn Tỵ, Chief of the Joint General Staff, and Major General Dương Văn Minh, Commanding General of the Field Command, and other officials.

== Report ==
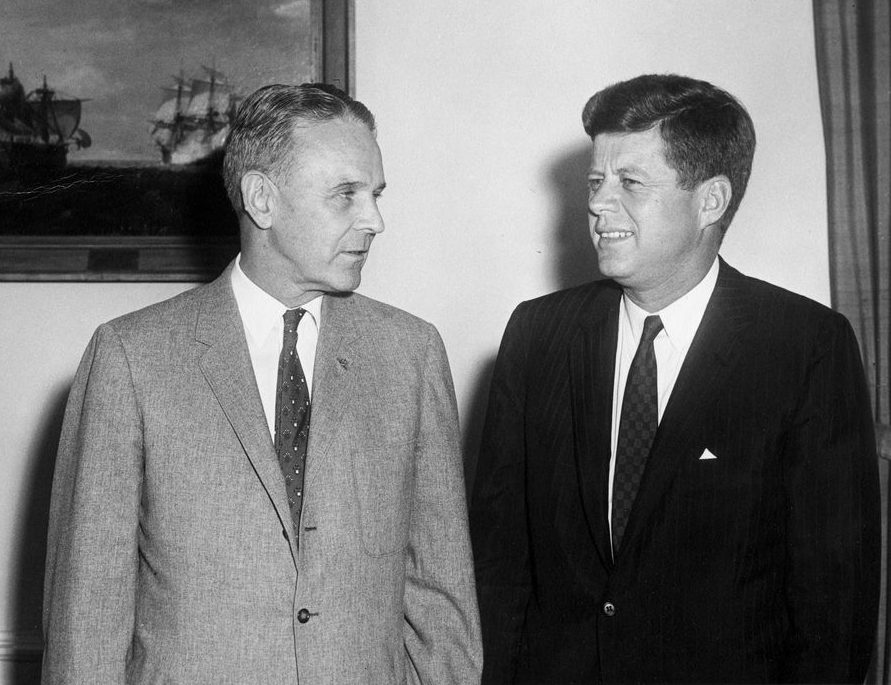
Taylor (l) and John F. Kennedy (r), June 1961

The report of the Taylor–Rostow mission was produced on November 3. It consisted of a loose-leaf notebook containing a letter of transmittal, a list of conclusions and recommendations, a 25-page section titled "Evaluation and Conclusions," and then a series of memoranda by members of the mission, including, most importantly, cables Taylor sent back to Washington in the days after the completion of the meetings in Vietnam.

Taylor sent his first cable back from Saigon on October 25, the day after the conclusion of his last meeting. He reported that the crisis of confidence and loss in Vietnamese national morale created by the Laos crisis and a serious flood in the Mekong Delta were weakening the war effort. In response, he recommended: improving intelligence on the Viet Cong; building ARVN mobility; blocking Viet Cong infiltration into the South Vietnamese highlands by organizing a border ranger force; and introducing U.S. forces, either for emergency short-term assistance or for longer-term support (providing flood relief and a military reserve). He observed that Diệm had reacted favorably "on all points."

His second cable, also from Saigon on October 25, was for Kennedy, the Chairman of the Joint Chiefs (Gen. Lyman Lemnitzer), the Director of the CIA (Allen Dulles), McNamara, Secretary of State Dean Rusk and Deputy Under Secretary of State Johnson. It elaborated on his recommendation to send U.S. troops to Vietnam. He suggested a force of 6,000 to 8,000, mostly logistical troops plus some combat troops for the force's defense. Their presence would bolster Vietnamese morale but their humanitarian mission would avoid any suggestion that the United States was taking over responsibility for the security of the country.

His third cable was from the Philippines on November 1, for Kennedy only. In it, he concluded that the communist strategy of taking over Southeast Asia via guerrilla warfare was "well on the way to success in Vietnam." South Vietnamese bad tactics and bad administration were allowing Viet Cong gains and inviting a political crisis. He recommended more U.S. support for paramilitary groups and ARVN mobility. The U.S. Military Assistance Advisory Group (MAAG) in Vietnam should be reorganized and expanded (including the deployment of U.S. troops he had noted earlier). Taylor felt the disadvantages of deployment would be outweighed by the gains. He asserted that South Vietnam was "not an excessively difficult or unpleasant place to operate" and the "risks of backing into a major Asian war by way of [South Vietnam]" were not impressive: North Vietnam "is extremely vulnerable to conventional bombing ... there is no case for fearing a mass onslaught of communist manpower ... particularly if our airpower is allowed a free hand against logistical targets."

Taylor’s fourth cable was also from the Philippines on November 1, for Kennedy only, and it elaborated still further on his recommendation to send troops. The commitment was essential if we were to save South Vietnam. Yet, he noted several disadvantages to it: (a) the strategic reserve of U.S. forces is so weak that the United States cannot afford to send forces to a peripheral area of the Communist bloc where they could be engaged for an uncertain duration; (b) although U.S. prestige is already engaged in Vietnam, it will become more so by the sending of troops; (c) if the first contingent is not sufficient, it will be difficult to resist the pressure to reinforce and if it is intended to close the Vietnamese frontiers and clean-up the insurgents, there is no limit to possible U.S. commitment (unless the United States attacks the source in Hanoi); and (d) the introduction of U.S. forces may increase tensions and risk escalation into a major war in Asia. Nevertheless, no other action would demonstrate U.S. seriousness of purpose and hence reassure the people and government of Vietnam and other U.S. friends and allies in Southeast Asia. He repeated his rationale for committing the 6,000 to 8,000 mostly logistical troops (noting that their purpose would not be to clear jungles and forests of Viet Cong guerillas) and added that they could act as an advance party for additional forces if CINCPAC or SEATO contingency plans were invoked. Finally, he expanded on his views that North Vietnam and China would be unlikely to enter the war because of the severe logistical difficulties they would face and the current existence of starvation conditions in China.

The "Evaluation and Summary” section of the report suggested urgency and optimism: South Vietnam was in trouble and major U.S. interests were at stake. Prompt and energetic U.S. action—military, economic, political—could lead to victory without a U.S. takeover of the war and could cure weaknesses in the Diệm regime. The mission was unanimous that the Vietnamese must win the war but most participants believed that all Vietnamese operations could be substantially improved by America's "limited partnership" with the South Vietnamese government. The government was cast in the best possible light. Any suggestion that the United States should limit rather than expand its commitment—or face the need to enter the battle in full force—was avoided. Underlying the summary was the notion that "graduated measures on [North Vietnam] (applied) with weapons of our own choosing" could reverse any adverse trend in the South. And the commitment of ground troops was always possible. The report recommended that the United States make obvious its readiness to act, develop reserve strength in the United States "to cover action in Southeast Asia up to the nuclear threshold in that area" and thereby sober the enemy and discourage escalation. However, in the summary, bombing was described as a more likely contingency than the use of ground troops; the latter was tied to renewed fighting in Laos and/or an overt invasion of South Vietnam. This was despite Taylor suggesting to Diệm that troops be sent and his cables recommending combat troop deployment to Vietnam.

Appendices to the report, written by members of the mission, gave a slightly different picture. There was less optimism about the government’s chances of success and less optimism about the chances of U.S. action—political or military—tipping the balance. For example: William Jorden (State) said that almost all of the Vietnamese interviewed had emphasized the gravity of the situation, growing Viet Cong successes, and loss of confidence in Diệm. The ARVN lacked aggressiveness, was devoid of any sense of urgency, and short of able leaders. Sterling Cottrell (State) said that it was an open question whether the government could succeed, even with U.S. assistance. Thus, it would be a mistake to make an irrevocable U.S. commitment to defeat the communists in South Vietnam. Foreign military forces cannot win the battle at the village level, where it must be joined. The primary responsibility for saving Vietnam must rest with the government of Vietnam. For those reasons, Cottrell argued against a treaty, which would either shift ultimate responsibility to the United States or engage a full U.S. commitment to defeat the Viet Cong.

== Aftermath ==
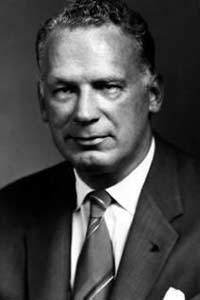
George Ball

Upon the completion of the Taylor mission and the receipt of Taylor's cables and the report, the Administration began to consider actions to take on Vietnam. Initial reactions to the mission (even before the report was completed) were received from Rusk, the embassy in Saigon, Defense Department staff, and the intelligence community. Rusk was skeptical of the value of the troops in light of the weakness of Diệm. McNamara, however, initially supported Taylor’s recommendation. He agreed that U.S. combat forces were necessary to prevent the fall of South Vietnam but he went further, arguing in a November 8 Defense Department memorandum to Kennedy that a clear statement of U.S. intent to use more force was necessary to convince Hanoi of American seriousness. He acknowledged, though, that such a move could lead North Vietnam and China to enter the war and potentially require the commitment of as many as 205,000 men. Undersecretary of State for Economic Affairs George Ball also saw, based on his earlier work with the French in Indochina, that a small commitment of troops could lead in several years to the need of as many as 300,000 and an American takeover of the war. Thus, he opposed Taylor and McNamara.

President Kennedy shared Ball's reservations about sending troops in light of the French experience, although he did not want to be seen as losing South Vietnam. Thus, he decided to send support units (airlift, intelligence, training) and military advisers, but not combat troops. He also sent economic support and administrators for insertion into the government of South Vietnam. In exchange, he demanded that South Vietnam commit its resources to fighting the war and undertake civilian and military reforms. The commitment of U.S. combat troops and strikes against North Vietnam were left only as possibilities for the future. His decision was reflected in a November 11 memorandum from Rusk and McNamara (who had been informed of it) and a National Security Action Memorandum signed on November 22.

Although Kennedy did not send combat troops, the advisers and support units ultimately markedly escalated the United States' commitment to Vietnam. At the end of 1960, there had been 900 U.S. military personnel in South Vietnam. At the end of 1961 there were 3,205 and at the end of 1963 there would be 16,300. Thus, although it received little attention in the press at the time because the discussion of the commitment of combat troops was concealed from the public, the Taylor–Rostow mission was a watershed in U.S. involvement in Southeast Asia. It also set the United States on the path of seeing the Vietnam War as primarily a military conflict when it was primarily political. And it was a conflict in which the United States repeatedly and seriously underestimated the resolve of North Vietnam. For these reasons, historians have been critical of Taylor and Rostow’s mission and of Taylor’s broader role in U.S. management of the war.
