= Lucien Conein =

French-American soldier, spy, businessman and DEA operative

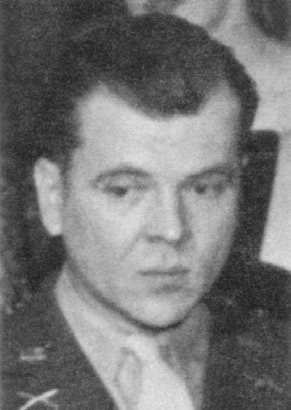
- Lucien Conein in uniform when awarded the French Legion of Honour, 3 December 1947
- Born: November 29, 1919; Paris, France
- Died: June 3, 1998 (aged 78); Suburban Hospital; Bethesda, Maryland
- Burial place: Arlington National Cemetery
- Spouses: Marian Marshall (m. 1941; div. 1942), 6 months Gwendolyn Axsom (m. 1943; div. 1943) Monique Denise Pierre Veber (m. 1946; div. 1947), 20 months Carmen Askisson (m. 1952; div. 1957) Elyette Brochot (m. 1958)
- Military career
- Allegiance: France; United States
- Branch: United States Army
- Rank: Lieutenant colonel
- Service number: 01 322 769
- Awards: Bronze Star Medal; Intelligence Star; Chevalier Legion of Honour; Croix de Guerre with Bronze Star

Lucien Emile "Lou" Conein (/koˈniːn/ (co-NEEN)) (November 19, 1919 – June 3, 1998) was a French-American citizen, noted U.S. Army officer and OSS/CIA operative. Conein is best known for his instrumental role in the November 1963 coup against Ngô Đình Diệm and Diệm's assassination by serving as Ambassador Henry Cabot Lodge Jr.'s liaison with the coup plotters, a role he came to regret.

== Early life ==
Lucien Conein was born to Lucien Xavier Conein and Estelle Elin in Paris, France at the end of World War I. When he was five years old, his widowed mother sent him to Kansas City to live with his aunt, who had married a US soldier. Conein attended Wyandotte High School in Kansas City, Kansas, dropping out after his junior year.

== Military career ==
External videos
- Extended interview with Lucien Conein (May 7, 1981). "America's Mandarin (1954-1963)" [Ep. 3]. In: Vietnam: A Television History. WGBH Media Library & Archives. OCLC 827298014.

In or before 1939 Conein joined the 173rd Infantry Regiment of the Kansas National Guard. He then joined the French Army and made a daring escape through North Africa after the Fall of France in 1940. After receiving a hero's welcome in Kansas City, he joined the U.S. Army in September 1941 and was sent to Officers Candidate School in 1943. As a native speaker of French he was asked to volunteer for the Office of Strategic Services (OSS). Conein was reported to have had a "flair for exaggeration" and his service in the French Army "was sometimes portrayed as a more romantic-sounding assignment in the French Foreign Legion". (Note: Although Conein was never an official member, he was reported to have been a regular at annual French Foreign Legion dinners in Washington.)

In 1944 he was ordered to help the French Resistance during the Allied landings in Normandy. He worked with the Jedburghs, a group directed by the OSS and the British Special Operations Executive.

It was then that Conein began working and living with the Corsican mafia, then called Corsican Brotherhood, an ally of the Resistance. They called him "Luigi," a nickname that stuck. He was quoted:

When the Sicilians put out a contract, it's usually limited to the continental United States, or maybe Canada or Mexico. But with the Corsicans, it's international. They'll go anywhere. There's an old Corsican proverb: 'If you want revenge and you act within 20 years, you're acting in haste.'

Conein was sent to OSS Detachment 202 in southern China in the spring of 1945. From there he led commando raids into French Indochina to attack the Imperial Japanese Army. He was awarded the Bronze Star Medal for operations conducted during this period. In August 1945 he met Ho Chi Minh, who he described as a “fascinating man,” and Vo Nguyen Giap, who he called a “brilliant sonofabitch.” His main complaint of the Vietnamese Communists was they served him tea rather than beer.

In 1945, the War Department's Strategic Services Unit (the successor to the OSS and a predecessor to the CIA) assigned Conein to their base in Nuremberg, Germany. His main assignments involved the resettlements of defectors and agents who had outlived their usefulness, using a combination of false documents, monetary payments, bonhomie, and implied threats. It was during this time that he lost part of two fingers on his right hand - he would tell most people he was injured in a secret mission, but in truth he was working on an automobile engine and his girlfriend tried to start it.

=== Vietnam 1950s ===
In 1954, Major Conein was sent to work under CIA operative Air Force Colonel Edward Lansdale against the government of Ho Chi Minh in North Vietnam, at first in a propaganda campaign to persuade Southern Vietnamese not to vote for the communists and then to help with arming and training local tribesmen, called the Montagnards. He was housemates with fellow CIA operative Rufus Phillips, who later wrote of him:

Conein impressed me as a dangerous man, a kind of John Dillinger on our side. There was a hint of barely restrained violence about him that his alert, blue eyes under bushy eyebrows, as well as his abrupt, blustery manner and short temper, did nothing to belie...Conein could be rough as a cob or as gallant and gracious as the occasion demanded. One Sunday afternoon in 1955 he showed yet a different side, when a group of Vietnamese with children were invited over for lunch and a swim at a house we had acquired that had a pool. I was surprised to find “Lou” in the pool, lifting the children onto his shoulders and throwing them into the water, taking care never to frighten them. He was laughing, clearly enjoying it as much as they. I was struck by the direct way he related to them and by his evident pleasure. For his friends he was generous to a fault, but he had been full of ingenuity and contrariness from an early age.

The historian Max Boot would describe Conein as:

...“stocky”...with a “leathery face,” “bushy eyebrows,” and limpid blue eyes who had already developed a reputation as a “wild man.” Given Conein’s boozy proclivity for mythologizing his own life, Great Gatsby style, it was difficult to know where reality ended and the legend began. A superb storyteller, especially if fueled by pear brandy, Conein himself cautioned, “Don’t believe anything I tell you; I’m an expert liar”...Lou Conein was an irrepressible character with a fondness for dark deeds and practical jokes. He had a violent temper, a drinking habit, and an eye for the ladies.

Lansdale would write glowing fitness reports of Conein and repeatedly expressed his high regard for his abilities, but privately he called Conein "the Thug."

During the week-long Battle of Saigon in March 1955, Conein was shaken after he had seen a family including three children killed from a mortar attack.

In 1955 a bombing campaign began which targeted U.S. diplomats' vehicles and a United States Information Agency library in Saigon. Conein discovered that the bombing was not orchestrated by Vietnamese patriots, as had been alleged, but by the French chief of staff of TRIM (a joint American-French military training group called the Training Relations Instruction Mission. The American military advisors including Conein, Lansdale and Philips were assigned to TRIM). Philips arrived home to find Conein swearing in French and English while slicing blocks of C-3 plastic explosive and attaching detonating cords to the thin slices. Philips asked if he could help, Conein put him to work making the small bombs but refused further help (Conein said “No goddamit, you didn’t see any of this, get out of here”). Conein then drove around Saigon at night with his fiancee Elyette Brochot and threw the bombs in the yards of leading French officials after lighting the fuses with his cigarette. That night also saw Vietnamese police arrest junior French officers in a jeep with explosives and a list of American targets. The bombings of American assets stopped.

Conein was advised in 1956 that he could not expect further promotion in the Army unless he again commanded troops in the field. Consequently he completed a six week course for Special Forces officers and then commanded two battalion-equivalent detachments in the 77th Special Forces Group. He would then have a two year assignment (1959-1961) at the CIA station in Tehran as an advisor to the Intelligence Directorate of the Iranian Army; he would retire from the military as a lieutenant colonel and the CIA in 1961.

== CIA contractor ==
=== Vietnam 1960s ===
Conein would return to South Vietnam in 1961 as a CIA contractor, despite his admission that he had 'reduced' his alcohol consumption to "four shots a day." Allen Ginsberg described him as "the crucial person" in the CIA's link with the Southeast Asian opium trade.

During the lead up to the November 1963 coup against Ngô Đình Diệm, he served as Ambassador Henry Cabot Lodge Jr.'s liaison with the coup plotters and delivered $42,000 of cash disbursements. Just days before the coup, on 25 October 1963, Secretary of Defense Robert McNamara would, despite Conein's expertise, tell President Kennedy that Conein was "an unstable Frenchman" and attempt to use his marital history to discredit him. Rufus Phillips, by then a USAID official, met with Conein hours after Diệm's assassination and described his demeanor as "ashen," "sick," and a "towering rage." Conein would secretly be awarded the Intelligence Star for his liaisons with the coup leaders. Years later he got drunk in Saigon with Edward Lansdale, who said “He tearfully asked me to forgive him for the Diệm action.”

Lodge's successor as ambassador, Maxwell D. Taylor, had Conein recalled from the country on 2 September 1964 after mistakenly blaming Conein for the problems between him and General Nguyễn Khánh. Conein was then slated for an assignment in Venezuela, but was called back to Vietnam in the summer of 1965 after Lodge returned to replace Taylor.

Daniel Ellsberg was a teammate of Conein's in the mid-1960s. He had an affair with the mistress of a Saigon-based Corsican gangster, which prompted the gangster to threaten to slit Ellsberg's throat. Conein went to the gangster and pleaded for Ellsberg's life. After Ellsberg leaked the Pentagon Papers, Conein regretted saving Ellsberg's life: “If I hadn’t interceded, he might have been bumped off” he wistfully said.

Sometime in 1967 Conein drunkenly threw flowerpots from a Saigon rooftop bar. In punishment he was transferred out of Saigon to remote Phú Bổn province, which he called Phú Elba. The CIA ordered him to undergo a medical physical in August 1967, after which he left Vietnam.

In 1968, Conein left the CIA and became a businessman in South Vietnam.

== Post-Vietnam ==
In 1972, President Nixon appointed Conein as chief of covert operations for the Drug Enforcement Administration (DEA). He was considered by former CIA colleague E. Howard Hunt for the group that undertook the 1972 Watergate burglary of the Democratic National Committee. Conein told Stanley Karnow, "If I'd been involved, we'd have done it right.

Conein retired from the DEA in 1984.

=== John F. Kennedy conspiracy theory ===
Conspiracy theorist L. Fletcher Prouty would accuse Conein of involvement in a conspiracy to kill President Kennedy, with Conein physically present in Dallas on November 22, 1963.

== Personal life ==
Conein married Elyette Brochot in 1958. They had three children. At the time of his death, he was survived by six sons, one daughter, 11 grandchildren, and one great-grandchild. His children were Laurent P. Conein, Philippe J. Conein, Caroline (Conein) Wilson (by Elyette Brochot), and Bernard Conein, Cecil Mashburn, Serge Conein, and Charles "Chip" Conein (by previous marriages).

== Death ==
Conein died of a heart attack, aged 78, at Suburban Hospital, Bethesda, Maryland in June 1998.
