= Joseph A. Mendenhall =

American diplomat (1920–2013)

Joseph Mendenhall

United States Ambassador to Madagascar
- In office 1972–1975
- President: Richard Nixon
- Preceded by: Anthony D. Marshall
- Succeeded by: Fernando E. Rondon

Personal details
- Born: January 15, 1920 Calvert, Maryland, U.S.
- Died: January 5, 2013 (aged 92) Green Valley, Arizona, U.S.
- Education: University of Delaware; Harvard Law School
- Occupation: career diplomat

Military service
- Allegiance: United States
- Branch/service: United States Army
- Rank: Captain
- Battles/wars: World War II

Joseph Abraham Mendenhall (January 15, 1920 – January 5, 2013) was a United States State Department official, known for his advisory work during the Kennedy administration on policy towards Vietnam and Laos. He was best known for his participation in the Krulak Mendenhall mission to South Vietnam in 1963 with General Victor Krulak. Their vastly divergent conclusions led U.S. President John F. Kennedy to ask if they had visited the same country. Mendenhall continued his work in the Indochina region after Lyndon B. Johnson assumed the presidency in wake of Kennedy's assassination.

== Early life and education ==
Born in Calvert, Maryland, Mendenhall graduated from the University of Delaware in 1940. Mendenhall also studied at Harvard Law School. He then served in the United States Army during World War II and was commissioned as a captain. Mendenhall served in the United States Foreign Service and was stationed in Turkey, Iceland, Switzerland, South Vietnam, and worked at the U.S. State Department in Washington, D.C. Mendenhall also studied at the National War College in 1962 and 1963.

== Krulak Mendenhall mission ==
=== Background ===
In May, civil unrest broke out in South Vietnam following the Hue Vesak shootings. Nine Buddhists were gunned down by the regime of President Ngo Dinh Diem after defying a government ban on the flying of Buddhist flags on Vesak, the birthday of Gautama Buddha and marching in an anti-government protest. Following the shootings, Buddhist leaders began to lobby Diem for religious equality and compensation and justice for the families of the victims. With Diem remaining recalcitrant, the protests escalated. The self-immolation of Buddhist monk Thich Quang Duc at a busy Saigon intersection was a public relations disaster for the Diem regime, and as protests continued, the Army of the Republic of Vietnam Special Forces loyal to his brother Ngo Dinh Nhu, raided pagodas across the country on August 21, killing hundreds and causing extensive damage under the declaration of martial law. Universities and high schools were closed amid mass pro-Buddhist protests. In the meantime, the fight against the Vietcong insurgency had begun to lose intensity as rumours spread of sectarian infighting among Army of the Republic of Vietnam (ARVN) troops. This was compounded by coup plotting by various ARVN officers which distracted attention from fighting the Vietcong insurgency. In the aftermath of the pagoda raids, the Kennedy administration sent Cable 243 to the US Embassy, Saigon, ordering it to explore alternative leadership possibilities.

=== Expedition ===
A fact finding expedition dispatched by the Kennedy administration to South Vietnam in early September 1963. The stated purpose of the expedition was to investigate the progress of the war by South Vietnam and the American military advisers against the Vietcong insurgency. The mission was led by U.S Marine Corps Major General Victor Krulak and Mendenhall. The four-day whirlwind trip was dispatched on the same day of a National Security Council meeting on September 6 and came in the wake of increasingly strained relations between the United States and South Vietnam. Civil unrest gripped that nation as Buddhist demonstrations against the religious discrimination of President Ngo Dinh Diem escalated. Following the raids on Buddhist pagodas on August 21 which left an estimated triple figure death toll, the US had authorised investigations into a possible coup in a cable to US Ambassador Henry Cabot Lodge Jr. as South Vietnam descended into chaos. The report of the conclusion was that Krulak presented an extremely optimistic report on the progress of the war, while Mendenhall presented an extremely bleak picture of military failure and public discontent. The divergent reports led US President John F. Kennedy to famously ask his two advisers whether they had visited the same country. The inconclusive report saw a follow-up mission sent to Vietnam, the McNamara Taylor mission, led by U.S. Defense Secretary Robert McNamara and Chairman of the Joint Chiefs of Staff Maxwell Taylor.

== Later career ==
In January 1964, Mendenhall became director of the State Department's Vietnam Working Group and in July he became the director of the Office of Far Eastern Regional Affairs. In 1965, he was named director of the U.S. Agency for International Development (USAID) Mission in Laos, then the second largest such agency in the world. In 1968, he returned to Washington as deputy director, and later head of the USAID Vietnam Bureau. Mendenhall served as American ambassador to Madagascar from 1972 to 1975.

== Bibliography ==
- Tucker, Spencer C. (2000). Encyclopedia of the Vietnam War. ABC-CLIO. p. 263. ISBN 1-57607-040-9.
- Ariz. couple had adventures, role in history

Diplomatic posts
Preceded by Anthony D. Marshall	United States Ambassador to Madagascar; 1972–1975	Succeeded by Fernando E. Rondon
