= John Mecklin =

American journalist

- Born: John Martin Mecklin; January 29, 1918; Pittsburgh, Pennsylvania
- Died: October 29, 1971 (aged 53); Fairfield, Connecticut
- Occupations: Journalist and diplomat

John Martin Mecklin (January 29, 1918 – October 29, 1971) was an American journalist and diplomat.

== Biography ==
Born in Pittsburgh, Pennsylvania, Mecklin graduated from Deerfield Academy, in Deerfield, Massachusetts in 1935. He then graduated from Dartmouth College in 1939. He was a war correspondent for the Chicago Sun in 1944-1946 and wrote for the Rome Daily American in 1946 -1947 before returning to the United States to write for The New York Times. He then went to Time from 1948 to 1966 and was on the staff of Fortune from 1966 to 1968, when he was named to the magazine's Board of Editors. While on leave from Time in the early 1960s he served as the Public Affairs Advisor for the U.S. Mission to the Organisation for Economic Co-operation and Development of the United States Information Agency in Paris, between 1961 and 1962. He then became the Public Affairs Officer at the US Embassy, Saigon South Vietnam from 1962 to 1964. He died of cancer, in a hospital in Fairfield, Connecticut, on October 29, 1971, at the age of 53.

== Sources ==
- The Papers of John Martin Mecklin at Dartmouth College Library
