= Arthur Henry White =

American businessman and humanitarian (1924-2014)

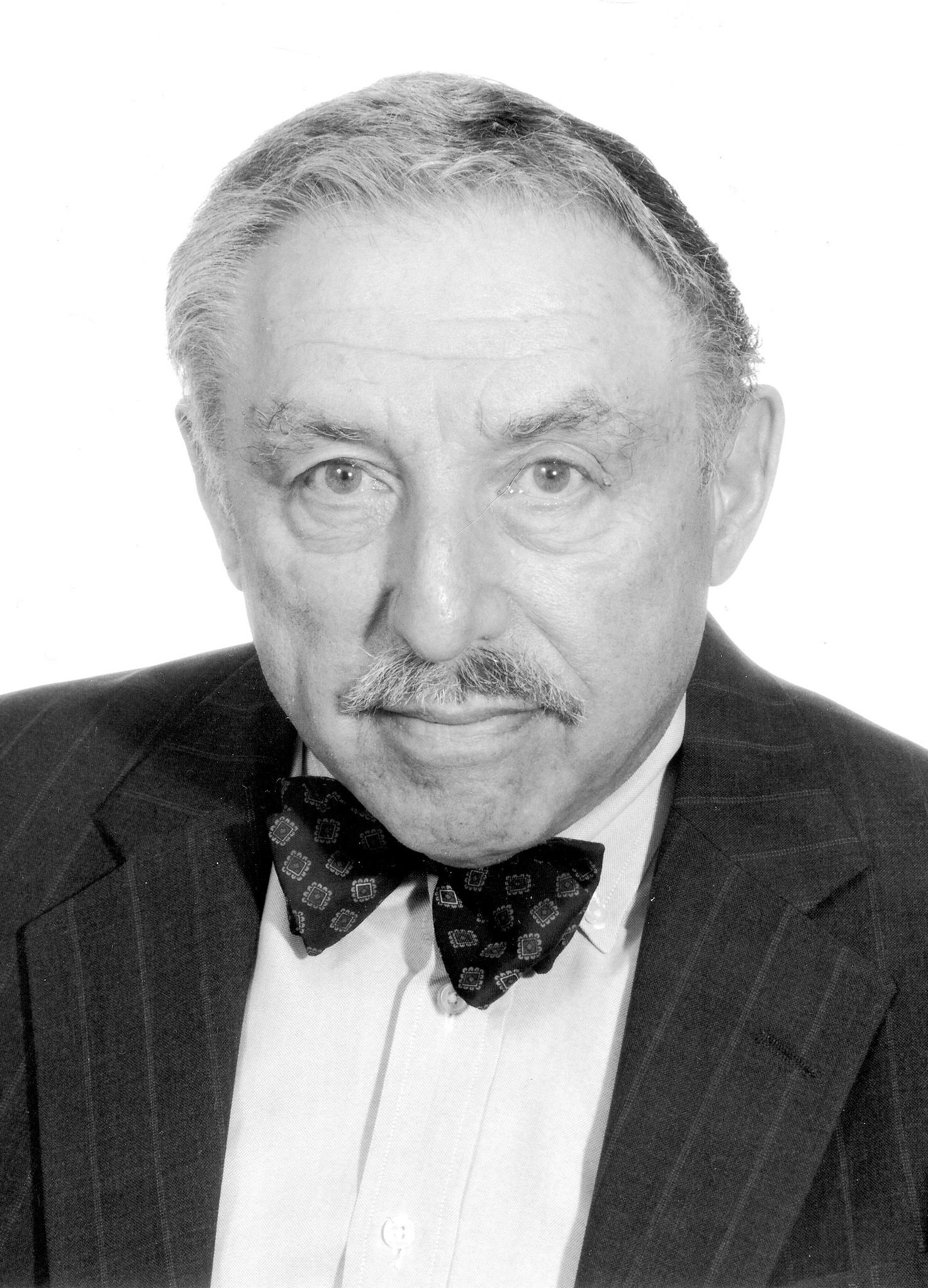
- Born: March 30, 1924; Boston, Massachusetts
- Died: August 25, 2014 (aged 90); Stamford, Connecticut
- Education: Harvard University
- Spouse: Vivien White
- Children: Joe White
- Parent(s): Maurice and Frieda White
- Relatives: grandchildren Daniel, Benjamin, and Sarah White

Arthur Henry White (March 30, 1924 – August 25, 2014) was an American businessman and humanitarian. He was a co-founder and vice chairman of Yankelovich Partners, Inc., a research and consulting firm; a co-founder of Reading Is Fundamental, the largest non-profit children's literacy organization in the world; and a founder of Jobs for the Future, a non-profit organization which analyzes, develops, and provides job training and education.

== Education ==
After graduating from Boston Latin School in 1941, White attended Harvard University. He interrupted his studies to volunteer for the U.S.A.A.F. (United States Army Air Forces). After the war, he returned to Harvard, graduating magna cum laude on June 5, 1947, with an A.B. in Government backdated to 1945, his original class year as was the custom for veterans.

White then worked as a research scientist under Douglas McGregor and Mason Haire at the MIT Sloan School of Management. White was accepted to Harvard Law School but after one year transferred to the Harvard Graduate School of Business where he found his calling in business. White graduated with an MBA in 1951.

== Career ==
In 1959, White joined the nascent marketing and research firm Daniel Yankelovich Inc. which became Yankelovich, Skelly & White in 1974, in recognition of the contributions of the executive vice presidents: Florence Skelly and Arthur White. As a principal of the company, White directed more than 200 research and consulting assignments for corporations, government agencies, industry associations, media, universities, and non-profit organizations. Between 1959 and 1986 Arthur, in addition to being a principal of the company, served as Vice Chairman and President. Yankelovich, Skelly, and White would, through a series of acquisitions, become a subsidiary of WPP, one of the world's largest advertising firms, merging in January 2008 with Henley Centre HeadlightVision to form The Futures Company. The Futures Company became a part of Kantar Group and is now known as Kantar Futures.

In 1986, two years after Yankelovich, Skelly, & White was acquired by the Saatchi & Saatchi Company, Ms. Skelly and Mr. White left, citing policy disagreements. White then founded and was the president and CEO of WSY Consulting Group, a management consulting firm, from 1986 to 1992. Daniel Yankelovich maintained a position within the new company, serving as chairman.

In addition to his professional work, White had a 'second career' in the non-profit and public service sectors which merited The Stamford Advocate to describe him in 2011 as a "Stamford humanitarian". In 2004, Brooke W. Mahoney of the Volunteer Consulting Group described White as a "civic pioneer"; in her interview with White, he said, "I believe I've had the greatest social impact as a nonprofit board member for organizations arguing for social change." In the interview, White explains: "My work in the nonprofit sector started with a phone call from John D. Rockefeller III in the mid-sixties. The research we did turned into the "Generation Gap Report," pointing out two key issues: first that our society had more goods and services than ever before—at the expense of the environment—and secondly: women didn't have a chance to participate in many aspects of society the way they should. CBS did a "Generation Gap Special" and we did a book, Generation Gap." Colleagues would later say that White was distinguished by his "knack for bringing together like-minded people and uniting them behind a cause." Between the application of his affable nature and his long-practiced marketing research skills, White's reputation for leadership preceded him: Margaret McNamara, the then wife of the Secretary of Defense, Robert McNamara, who wanted to address children's literacy in the United States was recommended by those on Capitol Hill to 'talk to Arthur White'; in 1966 the two co-founded Reading Is Fundamental with the help of then First Lady, Lady Bird Johnson.

White also made service in his local community a priority: a longtime resident of Stamford, he served as chairman of the Stamford Planning Board from 1959 to 1964. From 1976 to 1991, White was chairman of the Connecticut Housing Finance Authority. In the 1980s, White saw the potential good of uniting varied departments to complete one social action project, and in 1986, established Jobs for the Future with Hilary Pennington who would go on to serve as director of education at the Bill and Melinda Gates Foundation and as Executive Vice President of the Ford Foundation. Jobs for the Future provides both education and job training to match graduates with businesses eager to hire new talent. Jobs for the Future began in Connecticut; as of 2020, it now operates in 46 states. In 2011 Hilary Pennington traveled from Seattle, Washington, to Norwalk, Connecticut, to present the Norwalk Community College's Board of Trustees Merit Award in recognition of White's work in Stamford and the larger community of Connecticut at its commencement ceremony. Hilary viewed White's "incredible generosity of spirit" and his "relentless energy and curiosity" as the driving forces behind the success of the programs and people White championed. The then Governor of Connecticut, Dannel Malloy, also attended the Norwalk Community College Class of 2011 graduation ceremony. In his speech, Governor Malloy thanked White for giving him his first job out of college and remarked that he couldn't believe that White would hire a dyslexic kid to do market research. Malloy credited White's belief and investment in him with jumpstarting both the governor's professional life as well as his personal one as he met his wife on the job.

Out of the growing success of Jobs for the Future's mission "to drive change in the American workforce and education systems to promote economic advancement for all", then Governor Bill Clinton, asked White to come to Arkansas. White followed through in 1988 and formed a relationship with the governor, who, after winning the presidency asked White to join him as an adviser. White initially declined opting instead to return to Connecticut "to work in the private sector to develop resources that would make it possible for me to do public service." The President responded by offering White a position he could not refuse, one that combined private sector development and public service: in 1994, White was appointed by President Bill Clinton to the National Commission for Employment Policy, an independent agency which advises the President and Congress on national employment and training issues. White was also appointed in December 1997 by President Bill Clinton to the Federal Prison Industries Commission of which he was elected vice chairman. This position with the Federal Bureau of Prisons allowed White to combine his passion for public service with his longstanding efforts around child literacy through Reading is Fundamental: in 2003 White started CLICC in partnership with Connecticut Appleseed in 2003 with the aim to improve literacy rates among inmates and to help form and maintain meaningful family relationships between any incarcerated parent, their partner, and their children. CLICC enables this through the education of incarcerated parents in tandem with supplying the same reading materials both to them and to their children, allowing the families to read together. CLICC was pilot-tested with mothers at the Federal Correctional Institution in Danbury, CT (2009–10) and with mothers and fathers in the Connecticut state prison system (2014–16).

White served on the board of many other organizations: as vice-chair at the Institute for Educational Leadership, at WAVE (Work, Achievement, Values & Education), Inc., at Community Services Society, at Volunteer Consulting Group, and countless others. In 2011, U.S. Senator Richard Blumenthal described White's lifelong professional efforts and boundless energy: "His career is really about collecting and analyzing information to make it a force for change." This sentiment was echoed by Hilary Pennington in White's obituary, printed in The New York Times's Sept. 3rd, 2014 issue, when she said of White, "It was not enough to have an idea, he had to see that idea produce change."

== Personal life ==
White was born on March 30, 1924, in Boston, Massachusetts, to Frieda and Maurice White; his mother, Frieda, worked as a secretary at the publisher Little, Brown & Company, and his father, Maurice worked as an accountant for a railroad delivery company. He became friends with Daniel Yankelovich while attending Boston Latin School. The two would go on to be college roommates, business partners, and lifelong friends.

White's dedication to social activism greatly impacted his personal life: White cheered on General Marshall who, in delivering the June 5th, 1947 Harvard commencement speech, announced what would become known as the Marshall Plan; White helped organize a march in support of the Marshall Plan where he would meet Vivien, a chemistry major at Wellesley College from Chicago. An advocate and activist for the arts and education in her own right, serving as a board member of the Connecticut Commission on the Arts for 25 years, of Vivien Arthur said in 2011, "She has been marching with me for 62 years," referencing both their anniversary and how the two had met marching in support of the Marshall Plan. They were married a couple years after the march on June 19, 1949. White and Vivien had one child, Joe White, born 1961. On August 25, 2014, White died at the age of 90 after a stroke. A service in his memory was held at Temple Beth El where he loyally served for decades as Kohen.
