= Arthur White =

Arthur White may refer to:

- Arthur Silva White (1859–1932), British administrator, geographer and travel author
- Arthur Henry White (1924–2014), American businessman and humanitarian
- Arthur White (American football) (c. 1877–1929), American football coach
- A. Arnim White (1889–1981), American general
- Arthur Kent White (1889–1981), American Pentecostal bishop
- Arthur White (priest) (1880–1961), Archdeacon of Warrington
- Arthur White (Canadian politician) (1907–1973), Canadian politician
- Arthur L. White (1907–1991), Seventh-day Adventist and authority on his grandmother Ellen White
- Arthur White (baseball), American baseball player
- Arthur Henry White (1924–2014), American businessman and humanitarian
- Arthur White (actor) (born 1933), British actor, older brother of actor David Jason
- Artie White (1879–1960), Australian rules footballer
- Artie "Blues Boy" White (1937–2013), American blues musician

== See also ==
- Arthur Whyte (1921–2014), Australian politician
