= Future of American Democracy Foundation =

The Future of American Democracy Foundation is an American nonprofit, nonpartisan public policy foundation dedicated to research and education, working in partnership with the Yale University Press to clarify and analyze contemporary US domestic and foreign policy. Board members include distinguished scholars and experts with various political affiliations and beliefs. Board members include Jonathan Brent, Editorial Director of Yale University Press; Norton Garfinkle, former chairman of the George Washington University Institute for Communitarian Policy Studies; Thomas E. Mann of the Brookings Institution; Norman J. Ornstein, Emeritus scholar at the American Enterprise Institute for Public Policy Research; Hugh Price, formerly president of the National Urban League; Alan Wolfe of Boston College; and Ruth A. Wooden.

== Publications: The Future of American Democracy Series ==
The Future of American democracy Foundation has published a series of books to "present a new, balanced, centrist approach to examining the challenges American democracy has faced". Published works include:

- Norton Garfinkle, The American Dream vs. The Gospel of Wealth: The Fight for a Productive Middle-Class Economy
- Norton Garfinkle & Daniel Yankelovich, Editors, Uniting America: Restoring the Vital Center to American Democracy
- Reed Hundt, In China's Shadow: The Crisis of American Entrepreneurship
- Alan Wolfe, Does American Democracy Still Work?
- Daniel Yankelovich, Profit with Honor: The New Stage of Market Capitalism

== Published articles ==
In addition to books, articles by numerous Future of American Democracy Foundation members have appeared in leading publications, including the Boston Globe, the Denver Post, Newsday, the New York Times, Roll Call, the Wall Street Journal, and the Washington Post.
