= Reading Is Fundamental =

US non-profit literacy organization

- until every child reads

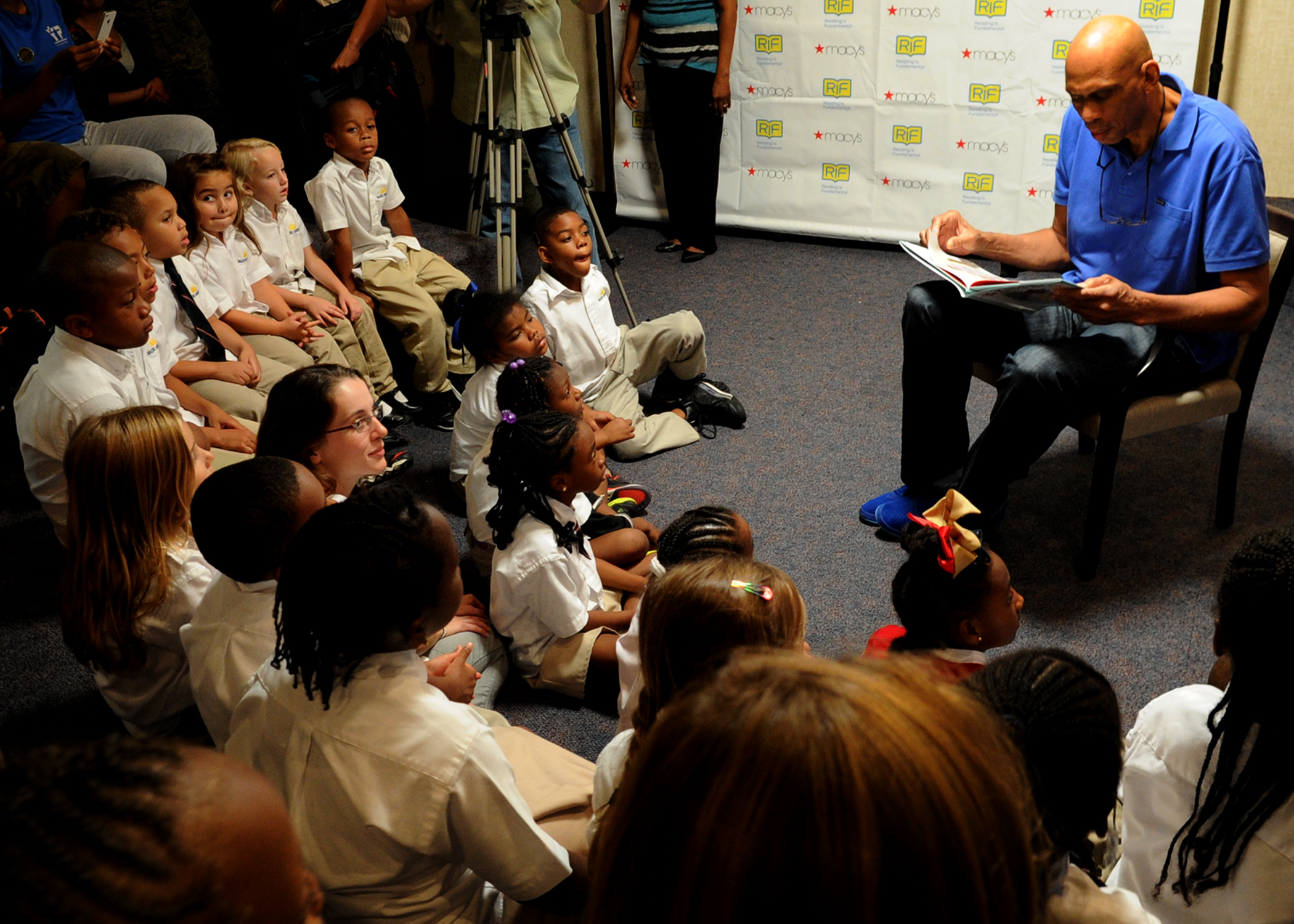
- Kareem Abdul-Jabbar reading, 2013
- Formation: November 3, 1966; 59 years ago
- Founder: Margaret McNamara
- Tax ID no.: 52-0976257
- Legal status: 501(c)(3)
- Headquarters: Washington, D.C., U.S.
- President & CEO: Alicia Levi
- Key people: John (Jack) F. Remondi, Chair
- Website: www.rif.org

Reading Is Fundamental, Inc. (RIF) is the oldest and largest non-profit children's literacy organization in the United States. RIF provides books (print and digital) and reading resources to children nationwide with supporting literacy resources for educators, families, and community volunteers. Since its founding in 1966, RIF reports that it has distributed over 430 million books to more than nearly 200 million children nationwide.

== History ==
Reading Is Fundamental was founded in 1966 by Margaret McNamara, wife of then United States Secretary of Defense Robert S. McNamara. Her idea for the program came about after she volunteered to read with children at a public school in Washington, D.C., and noticed that many of the students lacked access to books at home. With funding from the Ford Foundation, she launched a pilot project through the D.C. Public School system, providing free books for students to choose to keep. This included the launch of a bookmobile to increase reach outside of classrooms.

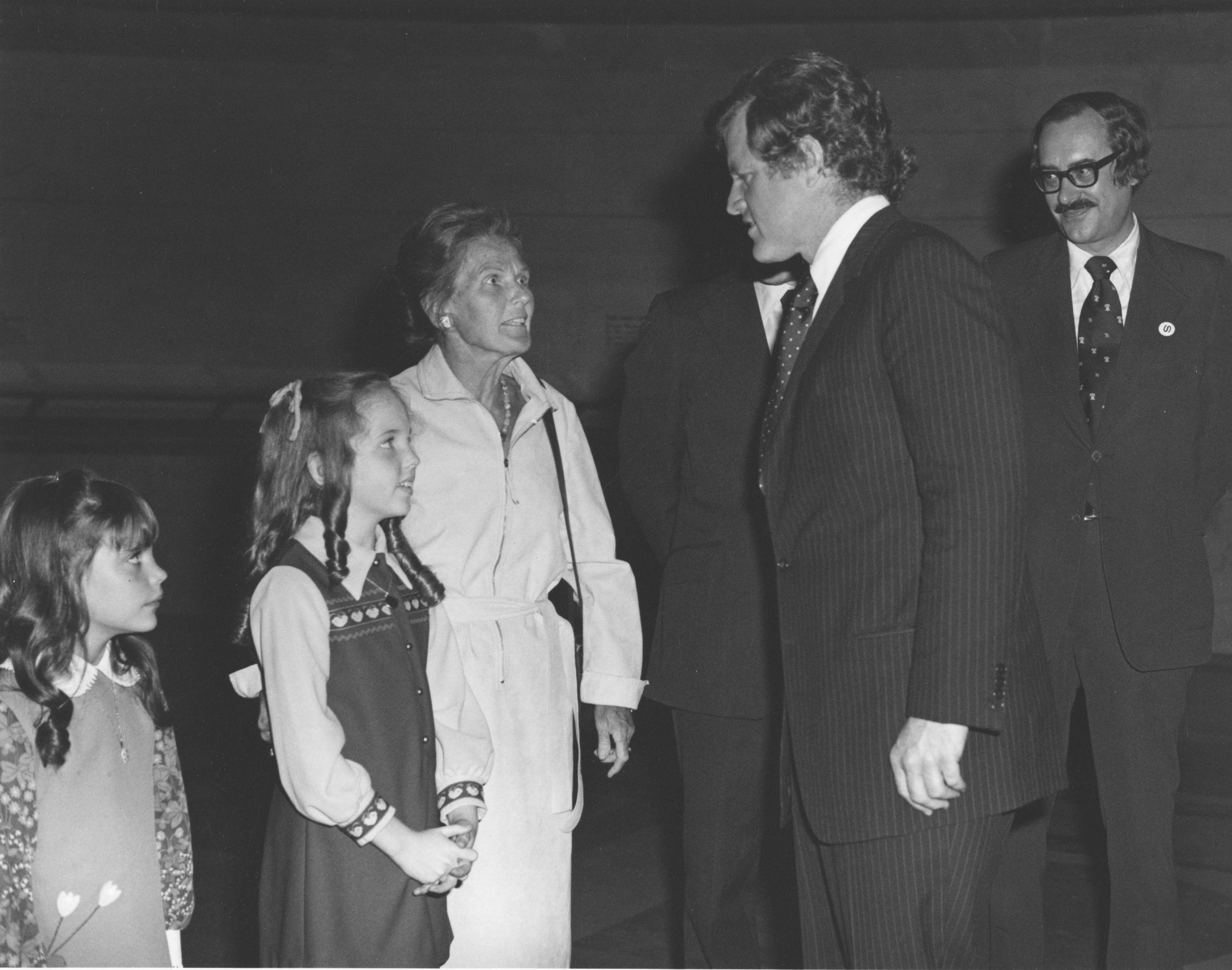
Program with Margaret McNamara and Ted Kennedy, 1975

Arthur White, was one of the organizations co-founders, with early support from the daughter of President Lyndon B. Johnson, Lynda Johnson Robb.

In 1975, RIF became an independent nonprofit organization. It quickly expanded across the United States, distributing books through partnerships with schools, libraries, and community organizations. By 1980, the program had distributed 37 million books and gained support from both public and private sources.

RIF administered significant federal funding through the U.S. Department of Education for decades, particularly under the Inexpensive Book Distribution Program. In 2011, Congress eliminated congressionally directed spending and thus congressional funding for RIF. RIF then began transforming its model to secure funding to continue its programmatic work via corporate partners, foundations, and individual donors.

Today, RIF continues to operate nationwide, delivering books and literacy programs to millions of children through ongoing corporate partnerships, foundation support, privately funded initiatives, and other federal funding sources.

In 2001, Carol Rasco, the former senior adviser to President Bill Clinton and later United States Secretary of Education Richard Riley, became the president and CEO of RIF, succeeding former Bryant University president William E. Trueheart who served in that role from 1997 to 2001. Ruth Graves led the organization from 1975 to 1997. In 2011, Congress eliminated congressionally-directed spending and thus federal funding for RIF. RIF then began transforming its model to secure funding to continue its programmatic work via corporate partners, foundations, and individual donors.

In 2015, RIF released the results of Read for Success, a two-year research study funded by a grant from the Department of Education. Read for Success is centered around motivating children to read by providing access to high-quality classroom book collections, books for students to choose and own, enriching STEAM-themed classroom activities, professional development for teachers and parent engagement. RIF continues to offer the Read for Success program.

In 2016, RIF celebrated its 50th anniversary with a national virtual birthday party hosted from Amidon Elementary School in Washington, D.C., where RIF's first program operated. Rasco departed RIF this same year, succeeded by Alicia Levi as the new and current President and CEO.

== Programs ==
RIF's flagship program is Books for Ownership which enables children to choose free books to take home and keep.

In 2017, RIF launched its free book resource website, Literacy Central (www.RIF.org/Literacy-Central), an online source of free digital resources.
