= Craig McNamara =

American farmer, activist, and memoirist

- Born: Robert Craig McNamara; 1950 (age 75–76); Ann Arbor, Michigan, U.S.
- Education: University of California, Davis (BS)
- Children: 3
- Parent(s): Robert McNamara (father); Margaret McNamara (mother)

Robert Craig McNamara (born 1950) is an American farmer and activist. He is president and owner of Sierra Orchards. McNamara founded and is president of the Center for Land-Based Learning. He has written a memoir of his life with his father, defense secretary Robert McNamara: Because Our Fathers Lied: A Memoir of Truth and Family, from Vietnam to Today.

== Activist ==
Robert Craig McNamara was born in Ann Arbor, Michigan. He is the only son of three children of the former United States Secretary of Defense, Robert McNamara (1916–2009) and Margaret McNamara (1915–1981). Though McNamara was born in Michigan, he comes from a family with deep roots in California as the first McNamaras arrived in California during the Civil War. McNamara is impacted by dyslexia.

During the Vietnam War, he was strongly opposed to the war, which made for difficult relations with his father. His father was shocked to discover that his teenage son had hung the American flag upside down in his bedroom, as Craig maintained that he was ashamed of America because of his father's actions as Defense Secretary. Craig recalled that his father exploded in rage when he saw the American flag hanging upside down, and was even more angry when he discovered that Craig also had the flag of the National Liberation Front, better known as the Viet Cong, hanging in his room.

McNamara later stated his views must have offended his parents, saying: "It must have really just hurt my folks. It must have been devastating". McNamara felt that the Vietnam War was "absolutely wrong" and was deeply hurt that his father refused to discuss the issue with him, saying dismissively that his son was an uninformed teenager. By the age of 17, McNamara had developed an ulcer, which he believed was caused by stress caused by his conflict with his parents over the Vietnam War. McNamara's grades at his private school suffered, in part because of his dyslexia and in part because of his conflict with his father, causing him to repeat Grade 10 in the 1966-67 academic year. Paul Warnke, an aide to the Defense Secretary McNamara stated: "I'm quite sure that the strong opposition of his own children to the war had a very definite impact on him. I think Craig in particular. He was very opposed to the war and was very disapproving of his father".

McNamara enrolled at Stanford University in 1969. McNamara took part in antiwar demonstrations at Stanford. Often joining him on the podium to denounce the war were two other students at Stanford, namely Susan Haldeman and Peter Ehrlichman, who were respectively the daughter of H.R Haldeman and son of John Ehrlichman. H.R. Haldeman and John Ehrlichman were respectively the presidential chief of staff and domestic affairs adviser under Richard Nixon, being known as Nixon's "Berlin Wall", owing to their German surnames and ability to grant or deny access to the president. McNamara recalled: "Pretty much all the time at Stanford was occupied with anti-Vietnam and Cambodia demonstrations...I remember the rage settling in on me, and the frustration that we all felt because we couldn't stop the war".

On 30 April 1970, Nixon launched an invasion of Cambodia to occupy areas adjunct to the border with South Vietnam. At the time, it was believed that Nixon was escalating the war, and the largest demonstrations ever against the Vietnam War took place in early May 1970. McNamara served as part of a mock court that convicted Nixon of war crimes for ordering the Cambodian invasion, which was followed up by a bout of window breaking and other property damage on the Stanford campus. McNamara was involved in demonstrations against the Cambodian invasion, and by his own admission smashed windows on the campus in protest, saying he felt very angry about the invasion of Cambodia. The historian Melvin Small described McNamara as leading an "especially destructive rampage" at Stanford that caused much property damage. After McNamara left Stanford, he spent several years traveling through Mexico, Colombia, Ecuador, Peru, Bolivia and Chile. In 1971, he moved to Chile whose president, Salvador Allende, was a Marxist in order to see Marxism in action. In 1984, McNamara stated that he moved to Chile because: "I felt an enormous sense of frustration with my family, with my country. I felt there was nothing I could do to change my father, so I left the country".

After arriving in Chile, McNamara went to work on a dairy co-operative farm on Easter Island. In 1972, Robert McNamara, who had become the president of the World Bank after being fired as Defense Secretary in 1967, visited Santiago to meet Allende to discuss loans made from the World Bank to Chile. At the time, as part of the "destabilization" campaign against Chile, Robert McNamara had come under immense pressure from Nixon to end World Bank loans to Chile. Craig believes that his father resisted this pressure, but also was opposed to Allende's policy of nationalizing various industries in Chile. The younger McNamara stated: "I think my father truly respected Allende-his compassion, his humility. But he disapproved of the nationalizations". Much to disappointment of his son, the elder McNamara ended all World Bank loans to Chile. Craig was in Santiago at the time his father met with Allende, but the rift between father and son was such that the two did not meet.

In 1973, McNamara visited the United States where over the course of a dinner, he became caught up in an argument with Katharine Graham, the owner of The Washington Post newspaper, and his father over Chile. The younger McNamara insisted that the Nixon administration was trying to overthrow Allende because he was a Marxist while both the elder McNamara and Graham insisted that there was no such policy on the part of the United States. Later on in 1975, the "destabilization campaign" waged by the Nixon administration came to public light. McNamara stated: "That's why I'm still cautious about my father to this very day-that's the flip side. If they [Graham and Robert McNamara] didn't know what was going on in Chile factually, they must had known it intuitively. But they wouldn't say so".

Shortly before he was due to return to Chile, the Allende government was overthrown in a military coup d'etat led by General Augusto Pinochet on 11 September 1973. The Pinochet government vowed to "exterminate Marxism" in Chile, earning a reputation as one of the worst human rights abusers in Latin America. McNamara chose not to return to Chile and instead enrolled in a course at the University of California, Davis to study agriculture. In 1974, Robert McNamara again visited Santiago to meet General Pinochet and announced that the World Bank would resume making loans to Chile. Craig was so outraged that he decided to fly to Washington to confront his father, recalling that he told him over a phone call that: "You can't do this-you always say the World Bank is not a political institution, but financing Pinochet clearly would be". Robert flatly replied: "It's too late. I've already made my decision". McNamara felt that his father was being disingenuous in his claim that he had to refuse loans to Chile under Allende because the nationalizations of the copper mining companies was an "economic" matter that was within the remit of the World Bank, but he could make loans to Chile under Pinochet because human rights abuses were a "political" matter outside of the World Bank's remit. McNamara stated: "I was really upset by that. That was hard to mend". McNamara graduated from Davis in 1976 with a degree in plant and soil science.

== Career ==
After a three-year apprenticeship with Ton Lum, McNamara founded Sierra Orchards.

=== Sierra Orchards ===
McNamara established Sierra Orchards in 1980. Sierra Orchards is located within the limits of Winters, California, a small city in Yolo County, on the border with Solano County. The orchard is approximately 450 acres and produces mostly organic walnuts. Sierra Orchards is recognized for its use of sustainable practices and conservation techniques. McNamara has also been recognized for his outstanding agricultural work and commitment to ensuring a healthy, sustainable food system for California and the nation. In 1992, McNamara described his mission as "...to inspire and motivate people of all ages, especially youth, to promote a healthy interplay between agriculture, nature and society through their own actions and leaders in their communities".

Craig and Julie McNamara are the founders of the FARMS Program, a partnership that started in 1993, joining Sierra Orchards (the operational farming entity of McNamara's family), UC Davis, the California Foundation for Agriculture in the Classroom and the Yolo County Resource Conservation District. FARMS is now integrated as a curriculum of the Center for Land-Based Learning.

In 2007, McNamara was asked in an interview why the walnut trees on his farm seemed so small, sickly and weak. McNamara replied: "Funny, you should ask. These trees are already fifteen years old, they are so stunted and weak, not because the moths are so much of a problem anymore, thanks to Rachel's biological control using synthetic pheromones." McNamara claimed that the problem was that the soil of California was infested with nematodes, parasitic worms that attack the roots of his walnut trees. He concluded: "There are no organic methods to control these nematodes and because we did not want to fumigate the soil with methyl bromide before planting, we accept the reduced yield". Methyl bromide is often used as a soil sterilant, but is also a potential occupational carcinogen linked to high rates of prostate cancer and impotence and a ozone-depletion chemical; most farmers in California still apply methyl bromide to their soil before planting their crops in the spring. When it was suggested that he use genetic engineering (GE) to alter his walnut trees to keep them safe from the nematodes without using methyl bromide, McNamara seemed hesitant, saying: "I don't know what to think about GE".

=== Center for Land-Based Learning ===
The SLEWS Program was formed in 2001, after partnering with Audubon California's Landowner Stewardship Program. This effectively doubled the number of students served annually. As a result of this dramatic growth and increased demand, in February 2001, FARMS Leadership, Inc., a 501(c)(3) non-profit organization, was formed and moved to its new headquarters at The Farm on Putah Creek in Winters, California. In 2004, FARMS Leadership, Inc. was renamed as the Center for Land-Based Learning. The program now reaches nearly 2,000 students annually.

=== California State Board of Food and Agriculture ===
Craig McNamara has served on the State Board of Food and Agriculture since 2002. On February 1, 2011, Governor Jerry Brown appointed Craig McNamara president of the state board. McNamara is working to ensure that the goals of Ag Vision 2030 are met. McNamara is passionate about sharing his knowledge of sustainable agriculture and leadership with the world around him.

=== Other affiliations ===
McNamara is a graduate of the California Agricultural Leadership Program and a Senior Fellow of the American Leadership Forum.

His professional activities include: board member of American Farmland Trust, Roots of Change Stewardship Council, University of California, Davis Dean’s Advisory Council and Agricultural Sustainability Institute advisory board member, Public Policy Institute of California advisory board, past member of the Foundation Board of Trustees University of California, Merced.

== Personal life ==
Craig McNamara is married to Julie McNamara. Together with his wife and three children, he lives in Winters, California.

== Awards ==
Craig McNamara is the recipient of several awards including the Leopold Conservation Award, the California Governor's Environmental and Economic Leadership Award, the UC Davis Award of Distinction and Outstanding Alumnus Award.

== Books and articles ==
- Wells, Thomas (2001). "Running Battle: Washington's war at home". In Alexander Bloom (ed.). Long Time Gone Sixties America Then and Now. Oxford: Oxford University Press. pp. 75–98. ISBN 9780195125146.
- Wells, Thomas (1994). The War Within America's Battle Over Vietnam. Los Angeles: University of California Press. ISBN 9781504029339.
- Langguth, A.J. (2000). Our Vietnam: The War 1954-1975. New York: Simon & Schuster. ISBN 0743212312.
- Merenlender, Adina; Buhler, Brendan (2021). Climate Stewardship Taking Collective Action to Protect California. Los Angeles: University of California Press. ISBN 9780520378940.
- Ronald, Pamela C.; Adamchak, R. W. (2008). Tomorrow's Table Organic Farming, Genetics, and the Future of Food. Oxford: Oxford University Press. ISBN 9780199742424.
- Small, Mellvin (2002). Antiwarriors The Vietnam War and the Battle for America's Hearts and Minds. Lantham: Rowman & Littlefield. ISBN 9780742583917.
- Talbot, David (May 1984). "And Now They Are Doves". Mother Jones. 9 (4): 26–33 & 47–50 & 60.
- Thayer, Robert (2020). "A Bioregional Bridge Across the Urban-Rural Divide". In David Fanfani, Alberto Matarán Ruiz (ed.). Bioregional Planning and Design: Volume I Perspectives on a Transitional Century · Volume 1. New York: Springer International Publishing. pp. 17–30. ISBN 9783030458706.
- McNamara, Craig (2022). Because Our Fathers Lied: A Memoir of Truth and Family, from Vietnam to Today. New York: Little, Brown and Company. ISBN 9780316282239.
