= Daniel Yankelovich =

American public opinion analyst and social scientist (1924–2017)

- Born: December 29, 1924; Boston, Massachusetts
- Died: September 22, 2017 (aged 92); La Jolla, California
- Occupation: Social scientist
- Spouses: Marti Yankelovich (m. 1950; div. 1958) Hasmeig "Hassie" Kaboolian (m. 1958; div. 1988) Mary Komarnicki (m. 1992; died 1995) Barbara Lee Yankelovich (m. 1999)
- Children: Nicole Mordecai
- Awards: Warren J. Mitofsky Award for Excellence in Public Opinion Research from the Roper Center for Public Opinion Research (2015)
- Website: Personal Website

Daniel Yankelovich (December 29, 1924 – September 22, 2017) was an American public opinion analyst and social scientist. Yankelovich was known for applying sociology and psychology to public opinion research and for helping to popularize the term "baby boomers" in the 1960s.

== Education and career ==
After attending Boston Latin School, Yankelovich graduated from Harvard University in 1946 and 1950 before completing postgraduate studies at the Sorbonne in France. As a psychology professor he has taught at New York University and The New School for Social Research. In 1996 he served as Senior Fellow at the John F. Kennedy School of Government at Harvard.

In 2015, Yankelovich received the Warren J. Mitofsky Award for Excellence in Public Opinion Research from the board of directors of the Roper Center for Public Opinion Research at Cornell University. Also in 1995 he was awarded the Helen Dinerman Award by the World Association for Public Opinion Research. In 2012, the American Association for Public Opinion Research honored him with the AAPOR Award for Exceptionally Distinguished Achievement.

== Research firms ==
In 1958 he founded the marketing and research firm Daniel Yankelovich, Inc., which was later renamed as Yankelovich, Skelly, & White, Inc., remaining chair till 1986. In 2008, Yankelovich merged with Henley HeadlightVision to create The Futures Company, a planning consultancy that exists under the WPP communications holding company. He also founded The New York Times/Yankelovich Poll, now The New York Times/CBS Poll. In 1976, together with Cyrus Vance, he founded Public Agenda, a nonpartisan group devoted to public opinion and citizen education.

== Landmark Education study ==
Yankelovich conducted an analysis of Landmark Education, Analysis of The Landmark Forum and Its Benefits, which consisted of a survey conducted of more than 1300 people who completed The Landmark Forum during a three-month period. Some details of the study methodology, especially concerning sampling methods and demographics of study participants, remain undefined in Landmark Education's "full report" on it. It is unknown whether any part of Yankelovich's study was based on direct empirical research through participation in any of Landmark Education's related coursework. Yankelovich concluded that 3 month after having participated 90% to 95% self-reported value in taking the course.

== The New Framework Group ==
By 1982, Yankelovich had grown concerned that many of the postwar policies which had more or less succeeded between 1945-1980 were badly in need of rethinking. With Congressman Les Aspin, Yankelovich chaired The New (New York) Framework Group, which brought together prominent men and women in a variety of fields, to discuss fruitful areas of reform. They created four subgroups: in economic policy, foreign affairs, social policy, and the role of government.

== Publications ==
His books include Coming to Public Judgment:Making Democracy Work in a Complex World (ISBN 0-8156-0254-5), The Magic of Dialogue:Transforming Conflict into Cooperation (ISBN 0-684-85457-0), Profit With Honor: The New Stage of Market Capitalism (ISBN 0-300-10858-3), and Uniting America: Restoring the Vital Center to American Democracy (editor, with Norton Garfinkle, Yale University Press, 2006 (ISBN 0-300-10856-7)).

== Trusteeships and advisory boards ==
He has served as a trustee at the Carnegie Foundation for the Advancement of Education, the Kettering Foundation, Brown University, and the UC San Diego Foundation.

Yankelovich was Chair of the Advisory Board of the Future of American Democracy Foundation, a nonprofit, nonpartisan foundation in partnership with Yale University Press and the Yale Center for International and Area Studies, "dedicated to research and education aimed at renewing and sustaining the historic vision of American democracy." He was elected to the Common Cause National Governing Board in 1976.

== Yankelovich Center ==
In 2012, he founded the Yankelovich Center for Social Science Research at the University of California, San Diego, devoted to using social science to find practical solutions to the nation's most pressing problems. The center's projects include a commission to recommend evidence-based strategies for increasing upward mobility.

== See also ==
- International Leadership Forum
- Landmark Education
- Raymond Fowler
- Arthur H. White
