= Fair Mortgage Collaborative =

Fair Mortgage Collaborative (FMC) is a non-profit organization created by the Ford Foundation and the Heron Foundation in 2009 to combat the abusive practices of predatory lending in the US home mortgage world. The company's main objective is to help consumers avoid predatory lenders and brokers, and enable them to obtain safe, fairly priced loans. In contrast Canada addresses mortgage fairness through federal and provincial regulation and licensing frameworks, rather than independent nonprofit certification programs like those used in the United States.

== Work ==
To combat predatory lending, the Fair Mortgage Collaborative certifies mortgage lenders, brokers, credit unions, and community banks as "Fair and Safe" based on the "Fair and Safe Lending Standards" they established. These standards were developed, written, and approved by mortgage industry thought leaders; mortgage industry loan officers, brokers, advocates; and other mortgage experts. The standards are strict and the certification process is lengthy. Once the lender is approved, they can place the "Fair Loan Certification" seal on their website and collateral. The Fair Mortgage Collaborative continues to watch each lender's loans to ensure their continuing compliance with the standards.

Most recently, with the passing of the Dodd-Frank bill, many of the Fair Mortgage Collaborative's standards have been set into law. However, there is a general apprehension among experts in the home mortgage field that many unscrupulous lenders will continue to find loopholes and abuse consumers. Therefore, the Fair Mortgage Collaborative is currently undergoing some changes to make their organization more consumer and research-focused. They are creating an easy-to-use portal of information to help guide consumers to "fair and safe" loans. They also plan to participate in mortgage abuse research and publish white papers with their sister non-profit and mortgage advocacy organizations to help keep mortgage lenders fair and safe for everyone. They will also establish the "Fairness Forum", a social community where borrowers can share information with other lenders in a safe environment. The goal is to help consumers "blow the whistle" on unfair practices.

== Staff and board members ==
The Executive Director is Howard Banker, a 30-year mortgage industry veteran, whose most recent position was Vice President of the Opportunity Finance Network. Mr. Banker has also worked for Bank of NY Mortgage Company, Neighborhood Housing Services of America, Low Income Investment Fund, Ford Foundation, Parodneck Foundation and others. Howard Banker also serves as the Managing Director of Energy Programs Consortium, a nonprofit research and implementation organization working for states and with the federal government around scalable energy efficiency finance programs. The Chair of the Board is Janis Bowdler, Deputy Director of the National Council of La Raza. Janis is an active Huffington Post blogger and an Hispanic financial advocate. Janis most recently spoke at the White House on improving access to credit for Hispanic borrowers. Other board members include Jon Rogers of the Federation of Appalachian Housing Enterprises, Cliff Rosenthal of the National Federation of Community Development Credit Unions, and Lisa Hall of the Calvert Foundation.

== Press ==
The New York Times and several other large publications wrote about the organization, calling it "...a mortgage watchdog group."

The Los Angeles Times called the Fair Mortgage Collaborative "...a new website to help consumers save on mortgages and closing costs."

Inman News cited the Fair Mortgage Collaborative as "...a good site to help consumers find fairly priced loans."

Market Place spoke to Howard Banker, Executive Director of the Fair Mortgage Collaborative and home mortgage expert, about how the Fair Mortgage Collaborative sniffs out bad lenders.
