= Hilary Pennington =

American philanthropist

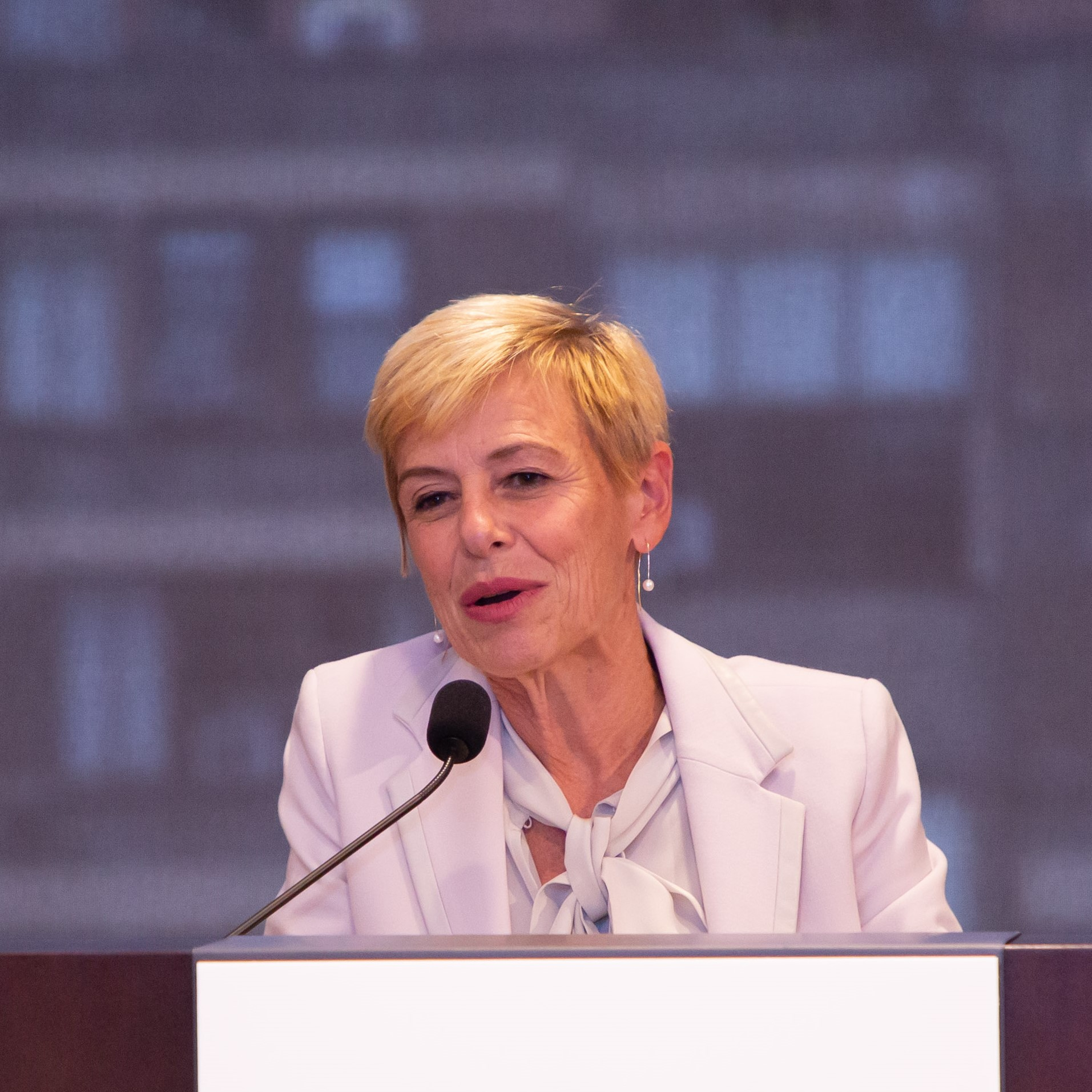
- Born: South Africa
- Education: Yale University (BA, MBA); University of Oxford (MPhil); Union Theological Seminary (MTS)
- Occupation: Philanthropist
- Title: Executive Vice President of the Ford Foundation

Hilary Pennington is an American philanthropist and the executive vice president of Ford Foundation, a position she has held since January 2018. Pennington is celebrated for leading the launch of the five-year, $5 billion BUILD initiative which invested in the sustainability and capacity of 300 social justice organizations around the world.

Previously, she was vice president for Ford Foundation's programming on Education, Creativity, and Free Expression.

Before joining the Ford Foundation, she was the Director of Education, post secondary success and special initiatives at the Bill & Melinda Gates Foundation and led the foundation's effort to double by 2025 the number of low-income Americans who obtain a post secondary credential by age 26.

== Early life and education ==
The oldest of 3 children, Pennington was born in South Africa. In her interviews with several media sources, she has mentioned that witnessing the inequality of apartheid in her father's home country of South Africa helped shape her lifelong passion for social justice.

Her later years were spent in St. Louis, with her family regularly spending summers in Door County, Wisconsin.

Pennington graduated from Yale University’s School of Management and holds a graduate degree in social anthropology from the University of Oxford. She also obtained a master’s degree in theological studies from Episcopal Divinity School at Union Theological Seminary.

== The Ford Foundation ==
In 2018, Pennington was appointed as the executive vice president of Ford Foundation. As Executive Vice President, Pennington oversees all programs, in the U.S. and globally, for the Ford Foundation, a social justice philanthropy with a $13 billion endowment and annual grantmaking of $600 million.

Pennington joined the Ford Foundation in 2013 as a program vice president. During her time as program vice president, she led the foundation's work on arts and culture, documentary film making, journalism, and youth leadership. Pennington was also responsible for leading the foundation's work in Africa and the Middle East.

== Other professional work ==
In addition to a background in education and social justice in the non profit sector, Pennington was a former adviser to Presidents George H.W. Bush and Bill Clinton, and, along with Arthur White, co-founded Jobs for the Future, a national workforce and education nonprofit organization with offices in Boston, Oakland, and Washington, DC.
