= Alan Wolfe =

American political scientist and sociologist (born 1942)

- Born: 1942 (age 83–84)
- Occupations: Political scientist, sociologist

Alan Wolfe (born 1942) is an American political scientist and a sociologist on the faculty of Boston College who served as founding director of the Boisi Center for Religion and American Public Life. He is also a member of the Advisory Board of the Future of American Democracy Foundation, a nonprofit, nonpartisan foundation in partnership with Yale University Press and the Yale Center for International and Area Studies, "dedicated to research and education aimed at renewing and sustaining the historic vision of American democracy".

== Education ==
A graduate of Central High School (Philadelphia), he received a B.S. from Temple University in 1963 and a Ph.D. in Political Science from the University of Pennsylvania in 1967. He has honorary degrees from Loyola College in Maryland and St. Joseph's University in Philadelphia.

== Career ==
Earlier in his career, Wolfe was a member of the collective that put out the Marxist-oriented journal, Kapitalistate, whose pages featured articles by such writers as Nikos Poulantzas, Claus Offe, Ralph Miliband, and Bob Jessop. By the early 1980s, Wolfe's politics had become more centrist. In 2004, one author characterized him as a radical centrist thinker.

A contributing editor of The New Republic, The Wilson Quarterly, Commonwealth Magazine, and In Character, Wolfe writes often for those publications as well as for Commonweal, The New York Times, Harper's, The Atlantic Monthly, The Washington Post, World Affairs and other magazines and newspapers. He served as an advisor to President Bill Clinton in preparation for his 1995 State of the Union Address and has lectured widely at American and European universities. He was ranked #98 in the list of the 500 most cited intellectuals in the 2001 book by Richard Posner titled Public Intellectuals.

Wolfe chairs a task force of the American Political Science Association on "Religion and Democracy in the United States." He serves on the advisory boards of Humanity in Action and the Future of American Democracy Foundation and on the president's advisory board of the Massachusetts Foundation for the Humanities. He is also a Senior Fellow with the World Policy Institute at the New School University in New York. In the fall of 2004, Professor Wolfe was the George H. W. Bush Fellow at the American Academy in Berlin.

"Wolfe, a self-proclaimed atheist, said he recognizes the importance of being open to religious ideas," a 2008 report about an "Ethics of Atheism" debate put it.

Wolfe has been the recipient of grants from the Russell Sage Foundation, the Templeton Foundation, the Smith Richardson Foundation, the Carnegie Corporation of New York, and the Lilly Endowment. He has twice conducted programs under the auspices of the U.S. State Department that bring Muslim scholars to the United States to learn about separation of church and state. He is listed in Who's Who in the World, Who's Who in America, and Contemporary Authors.

== Criticism of animal rights ==
Wolfe is an advocate of human exceptionalism and a staunch critic of animal rights, artificial intelligence and deep ecology. Wolfe is concerned that modern animal rights and ecological groups promote a dangerous anti-humanistic ideology. According to Wolfe, an essential difference between humans and other animals is the capacity for interpretation and meaning.

Wolfe argues that sociology is anthropocentric by definition since it is concerned with what makes humans different from the animate (animals and nature) and the inanimate (computers and artificial intelligence). Wolfe opposes the idea of "putting nature first" and identifies three groups as promoting this ideology: animal rights, deep ecology and the Gaia hypothesis. Wolfe has stated that animal rights philosophy would result in a world without fantasy, excitement and creativity and that non-human animals do not have moral rights as they do not possess agency or understanding.

Wolfe has argued that animal rights is a political movement that threatens the humanist values and lifestyles of ordinary people. Wolfe's book The Human Difference defends a unique human domain of being against the naturalising claims of sociobiology and artificial intelligence and the species arguments of animal rights advocates.

== Works ==
- An End To Political Science: The Caucus Papers With Marvin Surkin (Basic Books, 1970)
- Political Analysis: An Unorthodox Approach With Charles A. McCoy (Crowell, 1972)
- The Seamy Side Of Democracy: Repression In America (McKay, 1973)
- The Politics And Society Reader With Ira Katznelson et al. (McKay, 1974)
- The Limits Of Legitimacy: Political Contradictions of Contemporary Capitalism (Free Press, 1977)
- The Rise And Fall Of The `Soviet Threat (Institute for Policy Studies, 1979)
- Whose Keeper? Social Science and Moral Obligation (University of California Press, 1991)
- The Human Difference: Animals, Computers, and the Necessity of Social Science (University of California Press, 1994)
- Marginalized in the Middle (University of Chicago Press, 1996)
- One Nation, After All (Penguin Books, 1998)
- Moral Freedom: The Search for Virtue in a World of Choice (W. W. Norton & Company, 2001)
- The Transformation of American Religion: How We Actually Practice our Faith (University of Chicago Press, 2003)
- Return to Greatness: How America Lost Its Sense of Purpose and What it Needs to Do to Recover It (Princeton University Press, 2005)
- Does American Democracy Still Work? (Yale University Press, 2006)
- The Future of Liberalism (Knopf, 2009)
- Political Evil: What It Is and How to Combat It (Knopf, 2011)
- At Home in Exile: Why Diaspora Is Good for the Jews (Beacon Press, 2014)
- The Politics of Petulance: America in an Age of Immaturity (University of Chicago Press, 2018)
