= America's Cultural Treasures =

Ford Foundation initiative

America’s Cultural Treasures is a philanthropic initiative founded by Ford Foundation president Darren Walker, as well as Ford Foundation's Creativity and Free Expression program. Announced in 2020, with supplementary efforts in 2021, it raised over $165 million to support the operations of organizations dedicated to artistic and cultural diversity in the United States.

== History ==
The initiative was announced in September 2020 by the Ford Foundation as a joint effort among other philanthropists and foundations to pledge over $165 million to help "arts organizations run by people of color" in wake of financial difficulties from the COVID-19 pandemic. The Ford Foundation announced the initiative after a bond offering earlier in the year which allowed it to raise $1 billion and thus "substantially increase the amount of money it distributes."

Of the $165 million, $50 million came from the Ford Foundation, while the rest was pooled from the Abrams Foundation, Bloomberg Philanthropies, the Alice L. Walton Foundation, and some individual donors. $81 million was specifically set aside for "operational and general support funds to 20 organizations" that the Ford Foundation deemed "national anchors" for arts and culture in the United States; such was provided in the form of national grants of $1–6 million to the following recipients:

- Alaska Native Heritage Center
- Alvin Ailey American Dance Theater
- Apollo Theater
- Arab American National Museum
- Ballet Hispanico
- Charles H. Wright Museum of African American History
- Dance Theatre of Harlem
- East West Players
- El Museo del Barrio
- Japanese American National Museum
- Jazz at Lincoln Center
- Museum of Art of Puerto Rico
- Museum of Chinese in America
- IAIA Museum of Contemporary Native Arts
- National Museum of Mexican Art
- Project Row Houses
- Studio Museum in Harlem
- Urban Bush Women
- Wing Luke Museum

Later, in 2021, the Ford Foundation provided $35 million via multiyear grants to regional initiatives, with funding matched and disbursed by local, regional organizations like the Getty Foundation, Heinz Endowments, the William Penn Foundation, and the MacArthur Foundation, among others, as well as philanthropists like MacKenzie Scott.

In the same year, Walker was contacted by South Arts president and CEO Suzette Surkamer to launch Southern Cultural Treasures, a "supplement" to America's Cultural Treasures which raised and distributed funding to "12 to 15 arts groups led by people of color in the Southeast."
