= Margaret McNamara =

American educator and nonprofite executive; wife of Robert McNamara (1915–1981)

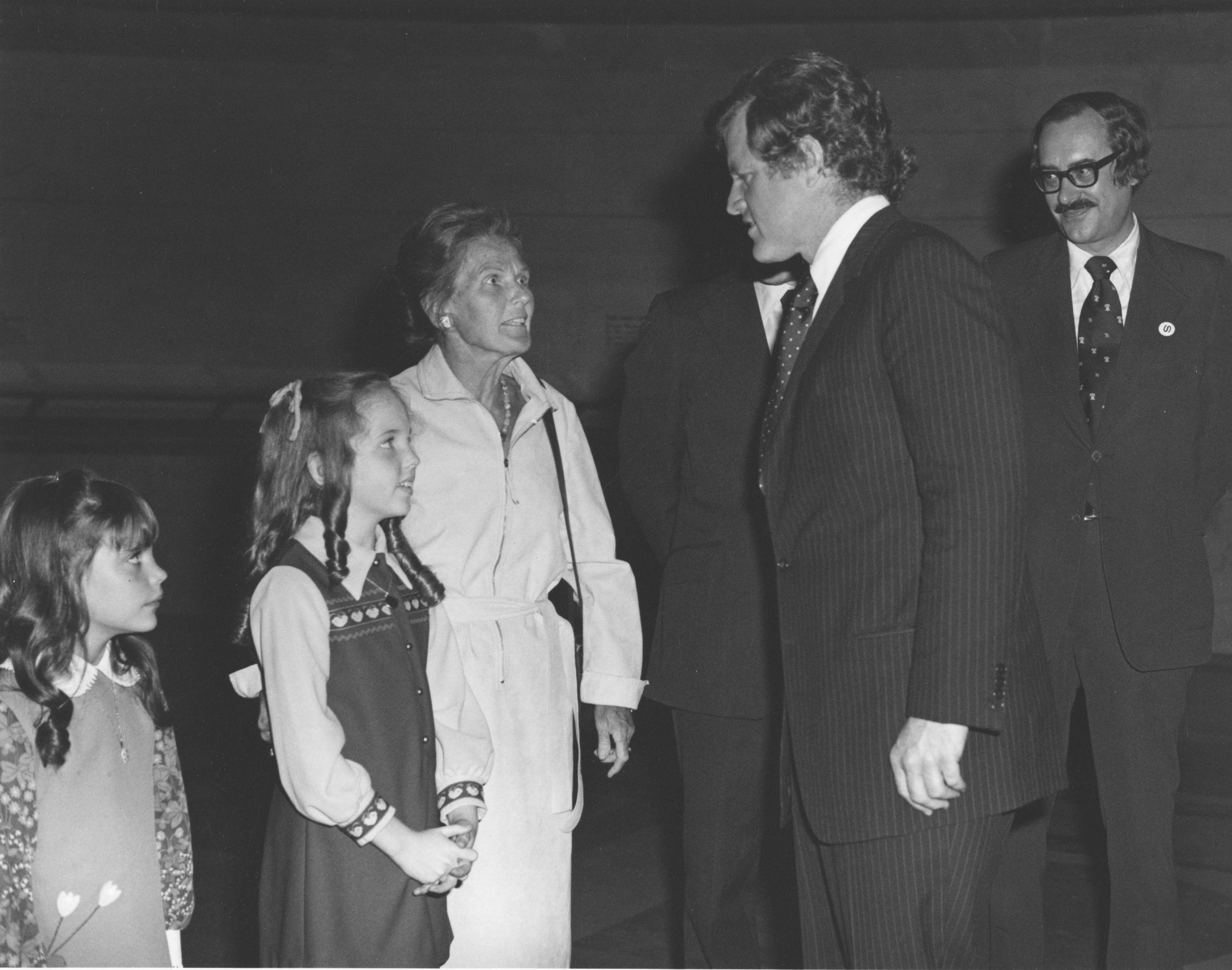
- Margaret McNamara with Ted Kennedy
- Born: Margaret Craig; August 22, 1915; Seattle, Washington, U.S.
- Died: February 3, 1981 (aged 65); Washington, D.C., U.S.
- Resting place: ashes scattered near Snowmass Village, Colorado, U.S.
- Education: University of California, Berkeley
- Occupation: Teacher
- Known for: Founder of Reading is Fundamental
- Spouse: Robert McNamara (m. 1940)
- Children: 3, including Craig McNamara
- Awards: Presidential Medal of Freedom (1981)

Margaret Craig McNamara (August 22, 1915 – February 3, 1981) was the founder of the nonprofit children's literacy organization Reading is Fundamental and the wife of the United States Secretary of Defense Robert McNamara.

== Life and work ==
McNamara was born on August 22, 1915, in Seattle, Washington, and grew up in Alameda, California.

McNamara attended University of California, Berkeley, where she met Robert McNamara, whom she would marry on August 13, 1940. Her husband's appointment by John F. Kennedy as U.S. Secretary of Defense led to their move to Washington, D.C. Her experiences while tutoring three children in the District led to the formation of Reading Is Fundamental.

On January 16, 1981, Jimmy Carter awarded McNamara the Medal of Freedom for her work with RIF. She died of cancer eighteen days later, at the age of 65. In summer of 1981, her ashes were scattered by her family on a mountainside meadow at Buckskin Pass, near Snowmass Village, Colorado. Margaret Craig McNamara is commemorated on her husband's grave marker in Arlington National Cemetery.

== Legacy ==
=== Reading is Fundamental ===
After many early organizational meeting with other educators in the District, McNamara secured a $150,000 grant from the Ford Foundation to support pilot activities in the District of Columbia. Following the success RIF had in Washington, the Ford Foundation increased RIF's grant to $285,000 in August 1968, enabling RIF to launch ten model programs across the country. From these early beginnings, RIF evolved into a national motivating force for literacy. At the time of McNamara's death in 1981, RIF had provided "more than 3 million poor children with 37 million books."

Today, through its contract with the U.S. Department of Education and with private funds, RIF provides 16 million free books for children to choose and keep each year. RIF programs operate in all 50 states, the District of Columbia, Puerto Rico, the U.S. Virgin Islands, and Guam. RIF is also affiliated with programs in Argentina and the United Kingdom. It achieves high visibility through public service announcements on children's television programs.

=== Margaret McNamara Education Grants ===
The Margaret McNamara Memorial Fund was established in 1981 to honor Margaret McNamara and her commitment to the well-being of women and children in developing countries. Grants are provided annually to support the university education of women from developing countries who are committed to improving the lives of women and children. Grant recipients study in diverse fields.

The volunteer non-profit organization was rebranded as Margaret McNamara Education Grants in 2015.
