= Public Agenda =

Public Agenda is a national, nonprofit, nonpartisan research and public engagement organization which aims to strengthen democracy and expand opportunity for all Americans. It has focused on many perceived problems, notably K-12 education, higher education and health care, as well as criminal justice reform, immigration and energy.

== History ==
Based in New York City, the organization was founded in 1975 by social scientist Daniel Yankelovich and Cyrus Vance, who served as United States Secretary of State from 1977 to 1980.The organization was established to try to bridge the gap between leaders and the public, ensuring that citizens' voices are heard in policy-making processes. Over the decades, Public Agenda has evolved to address a wide range of issues, adapting to the changing needs and concerns of the American public.

== Recent work ==
Recent initiatives include:

- Community Voices for Health: Amplifying the voices of marginalized communities in discussions of health policy.
- Democracy Renewal Project: Providing evidence and tools for the democracy renewal movement.
- Healthier Democracies: Gleaning insights from successful democratic practices around the globe aimed at increasing citizen participation.
- Hidden Common Ground: Helping Americans identify common ground, navigate their differences, and build fair, effective solutions to the challenges of our time.
- The State of Our Democracy: Understanding the challenges facing our democracy and the promising pathways for meeting them.

== Additional Information ==
Public Agenda engages with advocates, journalists, policymakers, and the philanthropic community to ensure public voices are heard in conversations that shape our shared future. The organization works closely with institutions and leaders to address barriers to democratic participation and build opportunities for engagement. They design expansive programs that help to outline ways to strengthen American systems and create resources that institutions and leaders use to make progress on the challenges facing democracy.

According to Caroline L. Gilson of DePauw University, "The audience for Public Agenda Online is wide-ranging: from researchers and policy-makers to concerned citizens and activists. For an academic audience, this site serves as a starting point for students exploring a topic who want to understand how the public weighs in on key issues".

== Controversy ==
Bloggers have sometimes criticized the organization for right or left-leaning research.
