= Sofía Gallisá Muriente =

Puerto Rican visual artist and filmmaker

Sofía Gallisá Muriente is a Puerto Rican visual artist and filmmaker. She was born in Hato Rey in San Juan, Puerto Rico and graduated from New York University with BFAs in Film & TV Production and Latin American Studies.

Gallisá Muriente’s artwork includes film and photography among other media. Her works utilize the study of history, archives, and collections in relation to the environment and colonialism and use film, video, prints, and writing. She explores broad topics of human life and creation, particularly through the lens of Puerto Rico and the Caribbean. Topics of her art include anti-colonialism, anti-assimilation, and anti-imperialism. She is queer.

== Early life ==
Gallisá Muriente’s parents are lawyers, and her father hosted a political radio show. She attended Montessori school, influencing her community, process, and practice-based approach. She was involved in theatre. Gallisá Muriente moved back to Puerto Rico in 2013, after living in New York for nine years. She had studied abroad in Cuba. From 2014 to 2020, Gallisá Muriente served as co-director of Beta-Local, a transdisciplinary/artist nonprofit organization in Puerto Rico.

== Selected works ==
Gallisá Muriente’s art is multi-media but often uses documentation and archives to convey and examine memory and imagination. One of her earliest works, created during her time with Beta-Local, Lluvia con nieve (2014) uses video from Paramount News that documents the 1955 transport of two tons of snow to Puerto Rico. Lluvia implements this archival footage to dissect the footage as an archive and extract its implications. She has said that “...art works for [her] as a mechanism for feeling and thinking at once.”

Many of her pieces parallel the physical within the metaphorical or historical. For instance, B-roll (2016) uses political material that encourages investment in Puerto Rico. The video is edited and presented to demonstrate the “tropes” of these sorts of advertisements and the parallels with other forms of persuasive or investigatory media. Her outlook on Puerto Rico is positive and hopeful and she explores imagery that emulates this thought, questioning why they are more of the landscape as opposed to the locals. This thought, she suggests, is “sinister” in its dismissiveness of the people inhabiting the places in question.

In 2018, Gallisá Muriente received the National Association of Latino Arts and Cultures' Puerto Rico Artist Grant, which awarded $2,500 to support the production of the series Asimilar y destruir. Asimilar y destruir implements physical alterations on photographs, manipulating their conditions. Recognizing how politics can complicate notions of beauty, she contemplates ways of looking at and observing a place and the effects of timing or history.

Her works often use imagery to cross the boundaries of time. Gallisá Muriente draws upon her family background and linkages to her family history in order to engage in counter-historical narratives. By connecting the intimate to a broader scope, she presents an empathetic view of transformation and reflection. She has spoken about the volume of photography in Puerto Rico since Hurricane Maria, which led her to the idea of decomposition. Using footage of Puerto Rico after not only Hurricane Maria but also COVID-19 in addition to personal video, Gallisá Muriente balances in Celaje (2020) the temporality of the damage in the images with the resilience of those in residence. Celaje is a part of the MoMA’s collection, Chosen Memories: Contemporary Latin American Art from the Patricia Phelps de Cisneros Gift and Beyond.

== Exhibition history and fellowships ==
=== Exhibitions ===
- The Whitney Museum of American Art (Greenwich Village, New York, USA),
- Savvy Contemporary (Wedding, Berlin, Germany)
- Embajada (San Juan, Puerto Rico)

=== Fellowships ===
- MoMA Cisneros Institute
- Puerto Rican Arts Initiative
- Smithsonian Institution
- Annenberg Media Lab at USC

== Partial list of works ==
Date	Title	Alternative title	Medium	Notes
2014	Lluvia con Nieve		film	
2015	La Princesa		film	
2016	B-roll		film	
2017	Wednesday at the Jamaat		film	
~2018	Asimilar y destruir	Assimilate & Destroy	series	
2020	Celaje	Cloudscape	film	
2021	Foreign in a Domestic Sense		film	with Natalia Lassalle Morillo
2022	The Envoy (even if it's not more than a truce)		film	
