= Artie White =

Australian rules footballer

Personal information
- Full name: Arthur William White
- Born: 11 June 1879; London, England
- Died: 31 July 1960 (aged 81); Dandenong, Victoria

Playing career^{1}
Years	Club	Games (Goals)
1901	Essendon	6 (3)
- ^{1} Playing statistics correct to the end of 1901.

Arthur William White (11 June 1879 – 31 July 1960) was an Australian rules footballer who played for the Essendon Football Club in the Victorian Football League (VFL).
