= National Commission for Employment Policy =

The National Commission for Employment Policy was an agency established within the United States Department of Labor. Originally established in September 1962 as the National Manpower Advisory Committee, it was re-designated the National Commission for Employment Policy when the commission was reestablished under the Comprehensive Employment and Training Act of 1973 (CETA). The Commission subsequently became independent of the Department of Labor in 1978 when CETA was amended.

Responsible to the President of the United States and the U.S. Congress, the Commission examined broad issues of development, coordination, and administration of employment and training programs. Specifically, the Commission held public hearings, visited employment and training sites, conducted and sponsored research, analyzed and synthesized studies and findings, and wrote reports preparatory to the issuance of official findings and recommendations. Commission reports were distributed widely within the federal government and amongst state and local governments, employment and training communities, and the public.

The commission was disbanded in 1995.
