= Robert McNamara =

American businessman and government official (1916–2009)

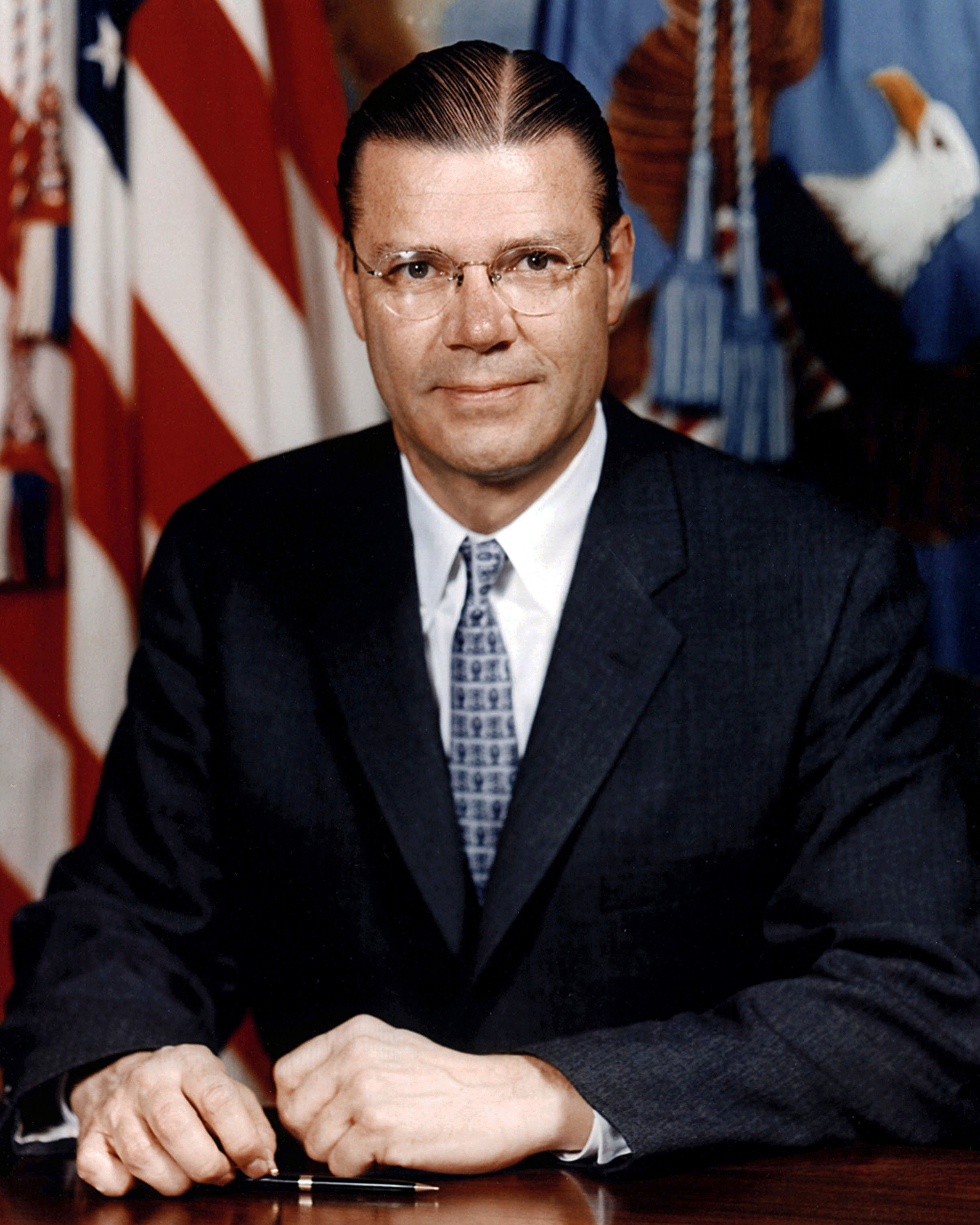
- Official portrait, 1961

8th United States Secretary of Defense
- In office January 21, 1961 – February 29, 1968
- President: John F. Kennedy; Lyndon B. Johnson
- Deputy: Roswell Gilpatric; Cyrus Vance; Paul Nitze
- Preceded by: Thomas S. Gates Jr.
- Succeeded by: Clark Clifford

President of the World Bank Group
- In office April 1, 1968 – June 30, 1981
- Preceded by: George David Woods
- Succeeded by: Alden W. Clausen

Personal details
- Born: Robert Strange McNamara; June 9, 1916 San Francisco, California, U.S.
- Died: July 6, 2009 (aged 93) Washington, D.C., U.S.
- Resting place: Arlington National Cemetery
- Party: Republican (until 1978); Democratic (from 1978)
- Spouses: Margaret Craig (m. 1940; died 1981) Diana Masieri Byfield (m. 2004)
- Children: 3, including Craig
- Education: University of California, Berkeley (BA); Harvard University (MBA)

Military service
- Allegiance: United States
- Branch/service: United States Army; Army Air Forces
- Years of service: 1943–1946
- Rank: Lieutenant Colonel

Robert Strange McNamara (/ˈmæknəˌmɛrə/; June 9, 1916 – July 6, 2009), also known by his initials RSM, was an American businessman and government official who served as the eighth United States secretary of defense from 1961 to 1968 under presidents John F. Kennedy and Lyndon B. Johnson at the height of the Cold War. He remains the longest-serving secretary of defense, having remained in office over seven years. He played a major role in promoting the U.S. involvement in the Vietnam War. McNamara was responsible for the institution of systems analysis in public policy, which developed into the discipline known today as policy analysis.

McNamara graduated from the University of California, Berkeley, and Harvard Business School. He served in the United States Army Air Forces during World War II. After World War II, Henry Ford II hired McNamara and a group of other Army Air Force veterans to work for the Ford Motor Company, reforming Ford with modern planning, organization, and management control systems. After briefly serving as Ford's president, McNamara accepted an appointment as secretary of defense in the Kennedy administration.

McNamara became a close adviser to Kennedy and advocated the use of a blockade during the Cuban Missile Crisis. Kennedy and McNamara instituted a Cold War defense strategy of flexible response, which anticipated the need for military responses short of massive retaliation. During the Kennedy administration, McNamara presided over the beginning of the build-up of U.S. soldiers in South Vietnam. After the 1964 Gulf of Tonkin incident, the number of U.S. soldiers in Vietnam escalated dramatically. McNamara and other U.S. policymakers feared that the fall of South Vietnam to a Communist regime would lead to the fall of other governments in the region.

McNamara grew increasingly skeptical of the efficacy of committing U.S. troops to South Vietnam. In 1968, he resigned as secretary of defense to become president of the World Bank. He served as its president until 1981, shifting the focus of the World Bank from infrastructure and industrialization towards poverty reduction. After retiring, he served as a trustee of several organizations, including the California Institute of Technology and the Brookings Institution. In later writings and interviews, including his memoir, McNamara expressed regret for some of the decisions he made during the Vietnam War.

== Early life and career ==
Robert McNamara was born in San Francisco, California, the son of Clara Nell McNamara (née Strange) and Robert James McNamara. His father was sales manager of a wholesale shoe company, whose family was Irish and, in about 1850, following the Great Irish Famine, had emigrated to the U.S., first to Massachusetts and later to California.

McNamara graduated from Piedmont High School in Piedmont, California, in 1933, where he was president of the Rigma Lions boys club and earned the rank of Eagle Scout. According to McNamara, scouting helped him set his values and was where he first developed an interest in public service.

McNamara attended the University of California, Berkeley and graduated in 1937 with a B.A. in economics with minors in mathematics and philosophy. He was a member of the Phi Gamma Delta fraternity, was elected to Phi Beta Kappa in his sophomore year, and earned a varsity letter in crew. McNamara was an ROTC Cadet in the Golden Bear Battalion at U.C. Berkeley. McNamara was also a member of the UC Berkeley's Order of the Golden Bear, a fellowship of students and leading faculty members formed to promote leadership within the student body.

In 1937, McNamara took a summer job as a sailor on the SS President Hoover. He was aboard when the Chinese Air Force bombed the ship near Shanghai Harbor. He was not injured. (Note: McNamara's account of his presence abroad the SS President Hoover during the air bombardment is found in the Additional Scenes on The Fog of War DVD.)

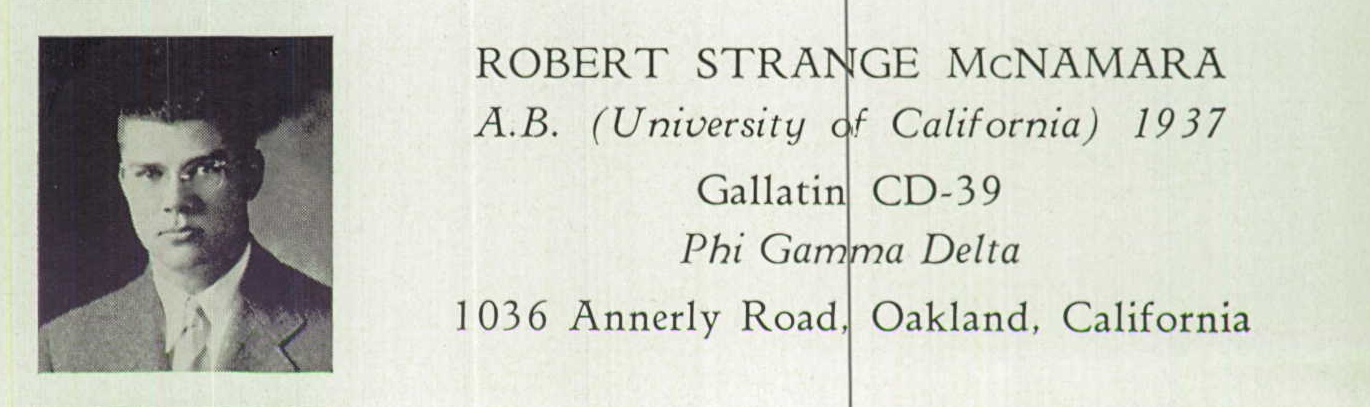
McNamara in the Harvard Business School yearbook, 1938

McNamara then attended Harvard Business School, where he earned a M.B.A. in 1939. Immediately thereafter, McNamara worked for a year at Price Waterhouse, a San Francisco accounting firm. He returned to Harvard in August 1940 to teach accounting in the Business School and became the institution's highest-paid and youngest assistant professor at that time.

== World War II ==
Leading into World War II, McNamara had two deferments from the draft—a family deferment due to having a minor child and an educational deferment, as he was teaching in an Officer Candidate School at Harvard. (Note: During World War II, with the need for officers exceeding the capacity of the standard officer candidate training, Harvard hosted OCS programs to rapidly train new officers.)

Following his involvement in a Harvard program to teach analytical approaches used in business to officers of the United States Army Air Forces (USAAF), McNamara relinquished his deferment and entered the USAAF as a captain in early 1943, serving most of World War II with its Office of Statistical Control. One of his major responsibilities was the analysis of U.S. bombers' efficiency and effectiveness by establishing a statistical control unit under the command of Curtis LeMay, first in the Eighth Air Force in Europe and then the Twentieth Air Force in India, China, and the Mariana Islands. McNamara was able to show that the nearly 20% abort rate of Eighth Air Force bombers was largely due to fear, which prompted LeMay to personally lead missions (to McNamara's admiration) and threaten courts martial. McNamara devised schedules for the XX Bomber Command B-29s doubling as transports for carrying fuel and cargo over the Hump (the airlift route during the war), and his analysis of the jet stream on XXI Bomber Command operations influenced LeMay's decision to begin low-altitude firebombing raids against Japan. During the war McNamara developed a negative view of the majority of officers (LeMay was an exception) because they largely refused to cooperate with his analytical work. (Note: Even General Jimmy Doolittle, a well-known intellectual, refused to buy into McNamara's analytical approach to warfare.) He left active duty in 1946 with the rank of lieutenant colonel and with a Legion of Merit.

== Ford Motor Company ==
In 1946, Tex Thornton, a colonel under whom McNamara had served, put together a group of former officers from the Office of Statistical Control to go into business together. Thornton had seen an article in Life magazine portraying the Ford Motor Company as being in dire need of reform. Henry Ford II, himself a World War II veteran from the Navy, hired the entire group of ten, including McNamara.

They helped the money-losing company reform its chaotic administration through modern planning, organization, and management control systems. Because of their youth, combined with asking many questions, Ford employees initially and disparagingly referred to them as the "Quiz Kids". The Quiz Kids rebranded themselves as the "Whiz Kids".

Starting as manager of planning and financial analysis, McNamara advanced rapidly through a series of top-level management positions. McNamara had Ford adopt computers to construct models to find the most efficient, rational means of production, which led to much rationalization. McNamara's style of "scientific management" with his use of spreadsheets featuring graphs showing trends in the auto industry were regarded as extremely innovative in the 1950s and were much copied by other executives in the following decades. In his 1995 memoirs, McNamara wrote: "I had spent fifteen years as a manager [at Ford] identifying problems and forcing organizations—often against their will—to think deeply and realistically about alternative courses of action and their consequences". He was a force behind the Ford Falcon sedan, introduced in the fall of 1959—a small, simple and inexpensive-to-produce counter to the large, expensive vehicles prominent in the late 1950s. McNamara placed a high emphasis on safety: the 1956 Lifeguard options package available on full-size Fords introduced the seat belt (a novelty at the time), padded visor, and dished steering wheel, which helped to prevent the driver from being impaled on the steering column during a collision.

In 1958, as VP of Operations, McNamara recommended discontinuing the unprofitable Lincoln line. After the Lincoln line's very large 1958, 1959, and 1960 models proved unpopular, McNamara pushed for smaller versions, such as the 1961 Lincoln Continental. This resulted in rising sales.

On November 9, 1960, McNamara became the first president of the Ford Motor Company from outside the Ford family since John S. Gray in 1906.

== Secretary of Defense ==
After his election in 1960, President-elect John F. Kennedy offered McNamara the chance to be either Secretary of Defense or Secretary of the Treasury; McNamara came back a week later, accepting the post of Secretary of Defense. McNamara's salary as the CEO of Ford was $3 million per year while by contrast the position of the Defense Secretary paid only $25,000 per year.

According to Special Counsel Ted Sorensen, Kennedy regarded McNamara as the "star of his team, calling upon him for advice on a wide range of issues beyond national security, including business and economic matters." McNamara became one of the few members of the Kennedy Administration to socialize with Kennedy, and he became close to Attorney General Robert F. Kennedy, eventually serving as a pallbearer at the younger Kennedy's funeral in 1968.

McNamara's decisions on weapons development and procurement would shape the U.S. military force structure well into the 21st century. (Note: Examples of military technologies begun or significantly advanced during McNamara's tenure which are still in use in 2026 include the permissive action links in nuclear weapons, the LGM-30G Minuteman III missile. the UGM-133 Trident II missile, the Los Angeles-class submarines, the A4W reactor plant in the Nimitz-class aircraft carriers, the naval anti-air Aegis Combat System, the Rockwell B-1 Lancer, the McDonnell Douglas F-15 Eagle, the Fairchild Republic A-10 Thunderbolt II, and the M16 rifle. His views on nuclear strategy have also persisted to the present.)

Aside from the nuclear arms race, the Cuban Missile Crisis and the war in Indochina (Laos and Vietnam), other conflicts that involved the U.S. Defense Department under Robert McNamara included support for the Cuban Bay of Pigs Invasion, confrontations at Guantanamo Bay Naval Base in Cuba, reconnaissance flights around the periphery of the Soviet Union and over China, the Congo Crisis, the Berlin Crisis of 1961, riots in the Panama Canal Zone, intervention in the Dominican Civil War, the anti-communist purge in Indonesia, the beginning of the Korean DMZ Conflict, and the USS Liberty incident. All but the Liberty incident were seen as part of the Cold War or potentially so.

When President Kennedy received confirmation of the placement of offensive Soviet missiles in Cuba, he immediately set up the 'Executive Committee', referred to as 'ExComm'. This committee included Robert McNamara, and was instructed by Kennedy to come up with a response to the Soviet threat unanimously without him present.

In May 1962, McNamara paid his first visit to South Vietnam, where he told the press "every quantitative measurement...shows that we are winning the war". McNamara's "quantitative" style based upon much number-crunching by computers about trends in Vietnam missed the human dimension. Aspects of the war such as popular views and attitudes in South Vietnam, and South Vietnamese president Ngô Đình Diệm's "divide and rule" strategy of having multiple government departments compete against one another as a way of staying in power were missed by McNamara's "quantitative" approach as there was no way that computers could calculate these aspects of the war.

Lyndon Johnson succeeded to the Presidency following the 22 November 1963 assassination of President Kennedy. Johnson had a profoundly insecure personality and heavily relied on McNamara's fealty and self-confidence.

Throughout his tenure as Secretary of Defense McNamara would prevent negative professional military assessments of the situation in Vietnam from reaching the President, Congress, and the public.

After the Gulf of Tonkin incident, on 5 August 1964, McNamara appeared before Congress to present proof of what he claimed was an attack on the Navy's warships in international waters off the Gulf of Tonkin and stated it was imperative that Congress pass the resolution as quickly as possible. Records from the Lyndon Johnson Library show McNamara may have misled Johnson on the purported attack on the Maddox by withholding recommendations from Admiral U. S. Grant Sharp Jr. against executing airstrikes until the facts were better known.

In November 1965, McNamara, who had been a supporter of the war, first started to have doubts about the war, saying at a press conference that "it will be a long war", which completely contradicted his previous optimistic statements that the war would be brought to a close soon.

In October 1966, McNamara returned from yet another visit to South Vietnam, full of confidence in public and doubt in private. McNamara told the media that "process has exceeded our expectations" while telling the president he saw "no reasonable way to bring the war to an end soon". Though McNamara reported to Johnson that American forces were inflicting heavy losses on the North Vietnamese and Viet Cong, he added that they could "more than replace" their losses and that "full security exists nowhere" in South Vietnam, even in areas supposedly "pacified" by the Americans.

By 1967, McNamara was suffering visibly from the nervous strain as he went days without shaving and he suffered spasms where his jaw would quiver uncontrollably for hours. McNamara would later deny that he was ever at risk of a breakdown.

McNamara commissioned the Vietnam Study Task Force on 17 June 1967. By January 1969, The Report of the Office of the Secretary of Defense Vietnam Task Force, as the Pentagon Papers were officially titled, was finished but widely ignored within the government.

McNamara left office on 29 February 1968; for his efforts, the President awarded him both the Medal of Freedom and the Distinguished Service Medal.

== World Bank president ==
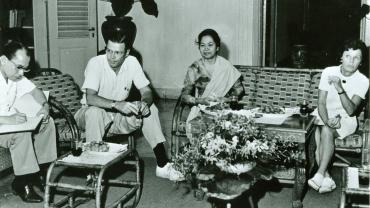
McNamara visited Jakarta, Indonesia during his tenure as World Bank president in 1968.

Robert McNamara served as head of the World Bank from April 1968 to June 1981, when he turned 65. A safe was installed in McNamara's office at the World Bank to house his papers relating to his time as Defense Secretary, which was a normal courtesy extended to former Defense Secretaries who might face controversy over their actions and wish to defend themselves by quoting from the documentary record. When the Pentagon Papers were finished in April 1969, and a copy of the Papers were brought into McNamara's office, he became angry and said: "I don't want to see it! Take it back!" By 1969, McNamara wanted to forget the Vietnam war and did not want any reminders of his former job.

=== Tenure ===
In his 13 years at the Bank, he introduced key changes, most notably, shifting the Bank's economic development policies toward targeted poverty reduction. Prior to his tenure at the World Bank, poverty did not receive substantial attention as part of international and national economic development; the focus of development had been on industrialization and infrastructure. Poverty also came to be redefined as a condition faced by people rather than countries. According to Martha Finnemore, the World Bank under McNamara's tenure "sold" states poverty reduction "through a mixture of persuasion and coercion." McNamara negotiated, with the conflicting countries represented on the Board, a growth in funds to channel credits for development, in the form of health, food, and education projects. He also instituted new methods of evaluating the effectiveness of funded projects. One notable project started under McNamara's leadership was the effort to the creation of the Onchocerciasis Control Program to eradicate river blindness by an alliance of the World Bank, WHO, UNDP and FAO.

The World Bank currently has a scholarship program under his name.

=== Controversies ===
==== Robert Kennedy endorsement ====
In March 1968, McNamara's friend Senator Robert Kennedy entered the Democratic primaries with aim of challenging Lyndon Johnson. Kennedy asked McNamara to tape a statement praising his leadership during the Cuban Missile Crisis with the understanding that the statement was meant for a TV ad. McNamara praised Kennedy's "shrewd diplomacy", saying he had "remained calm and cool, firm, but restrained, never nettled and never rattled". Though this was a violation of World Bank rules, McNamara felt guilty over refusing Kennedy's requests to resign and decline the World Bank presidency. He was attacked for the tape with the New York Times in an editorial lambasting him for his "poor judgement and poorer taste". For a time, McNamara feared he would be fired from the World Bank.

==== 1973 Chilean coup ====
In 1972, McNamara visited Santiago to meet President Salvador Allende to discuss the latter's policy of nationalization, especially of the copper mining companies. McNamara's son, Craig McNamara was living in Chile at the time, but the two did not meet owing to the rift over the Vietnam war. McNamara fils stated in 1984: "I think my father truly respected Allende-his compassion, his humility. But he disapproved of the nationalizations". The meeting with Allende concluded with McNamara ending all World Bank loans to Chile. On 11 September 1973, Allende was overthrown in a coup d'état led by General Augusto Pinochet. In 1974, McNamara visited Santiago to meet Pinochet and agreed to the World Bank resuming loans to Chile. Craig McNamara, who was visiting the United States at the time of the coup and chose not to return to Chile was outraged by the decision to resume the loans, telling his father in a phone call: "You can't do this-you always say the World Bank is not a political institution, but financing Pinochet clearly would be". McNamara pere flatly stated in reply: "It's too late. I've already made my decision". McNamara fils felt that his father's claim that he had to cease loans to Chile because the Allende government's nationalization policy was an "economic" matter that fell within the purview of the World Bank, but human rights abuses under Pinochet were a "political" matter that was outside of the World Bank's purview was disingenuous and dishonest. Craig McNamara stated: "I was really upset by that. That was hard to mend".

==== Church Committee ====
In 1975 McNamara was called to give testimony before the United States Senate Select Committee to Study Governmental Operations with Respect to Intelligence Activities chaired by Senator Frank Church. Retired General Edward Lansdale and others had already given testimony regarding Operation Mongoose, a program created by President Kennedy to assassinate leading Cubans including Fidel Castro. McNamara blasted Lansdale's released testimony “for what I consider loose and irresponsible and at times contradictory testimony in the press...I am damn annoyed at the damage he has done to dead people [i.e., the Kennedys]” despite his knowledge that Lansdale's testimony was substantially true. (Note: Lansdale in his Church committee testimony had hedged the Kennedys' involvement by stating he never received a "direct order" from them to assist Operation Mongoose; McNamara used this hedge against Lansdale even though both men were trying to protect the Kennedys' reputations.)

==== Forced sterilization ====
As World Bank President, he declared at the 1968 Annual Meeting of the International Monetary Fund and the World Bank Group that countries permitting birth control practices would get preferential access to resources. During the 1975-1977 emergency in India, McNamara remarked "At long last, India is moving to effectively address its population problem," regarding the forced sterilization. Many deaths occurred as a result of both the male and the female sterilization programs, due to poor sanitation and quality standards in the Indian sterilization camps.

== Post-World Bank activities ==
From 1981 to 1984, McNamara served on the board of trustees at American University in Washington, D.C.

He was elected to the American Philosophical Society in 1981.

In 1982, McNamara joined several other former national security officials in urging that the United States pledge to not use nuclear weapons first in Europe in the event of hostilities; subsequently he proposed the elimination of nuclear weapons as an element of NATO's defense posture.

McNamara maintained his involvement in politics in his later years, delivering statements critical of the Bush administration's 2003 invasion of Iraq. On 5 January 2006, McNamara and most living former Secretaries of Defense and Secretaries of State met briefly at the White House with President Bush to discuss the war.

=== Memoir ===
External videos
- Booknotes interview with McNamara on In Retrospect, April 23, 1995, C-SPAN

McNamara's memoir, In Retrospect: The Tragedy and Lessons of Vietnam, published in 1995, presented an account and analysis of the Vietnam War from his point of view. According to his lengthy New York Times obituary, "[h]e concluded well before leaving the Pentagon that the war was futile, but he did not share that insight with the public until late in life. In 1995, he took a stand against his own conduct of the war, confessing in a memoir that it was 'wrong, terribly wrong'." In return, he faced a "firestorm of scorn" at that time.

=== 1995 Vietnam visit ===
In November 1995, McNamara returned to Vietnam, this time visiting Hanoi. Despite his role as one of the architects of Operation Rolling Thunder, McNamara met with a surprisingly warm reception, even from those who survived the bombing raids, and was often asked to autograph pirate editions of In Retrospect which had been illegally translated and published in Vietnam. During his visit, McNamara met his opposite number during the war, General Võ Nguyên Giáp who served as North Vietnam's Defense Minister. During his conversation, McNamara brought up the Gulf of Tonkin incident and asked Giáp what happened on 4 August 1964. "Absolutely nothing", Giáp replied. Giáp confirmed that the attack on 4 August 1964 had been imaginary while also confirming that the attack on 2 August happened.

The American historian Charles Neu who was present at the McNamara-Giáp meeting observed the differences in the style of the two men with McNamara repeatedly interrupting Giáp to ask questions, usually related to something numerical, while Giáp gave a long leisurely monologue, quoting various Vietnamese cultural figures such as poets, that began with Vietnamese revolts against China during the years 111 BC–938 AD when Vietnam was a Chinese province. Neu wrote his impression was that McNamara was a figure who thought in the short term while Giáp thought in the long term.

== Assessments ==
Perhaps the earliest assessment of Robert McNamara was David Halberstam's 1972 book The Best and the Brightest. Halberstam reported on McNamara's propensity to lie:

Bob McNamara was a remarkable man in a remarkable era; if at the beginning he seemed to embody many if not most of the era’s virtues, at the end of it he seemed to embody its pathos, flaws and tragedy...He would, for instance, lie, dissemble, not just to the public, they all did that in varying degrees, but inside, in high-level meetings, always for the good of the cause, always for the right reason, always to serve the Office of the President. Bob knew what was good for the cause, but sometimes at the expense of his colleagues. And indeed, experienced McNamara watchers, men who were fond of him, would swear they knew when Bob was lying; his voice would get higher, he would speak faster, he would become more insistent.

Halberstam also excoriated McNamara's disregard for valuable information that was not quantified; he reported on one incident in 1965 in Da Nang and concluded “...he did not serve himself nor the country well; he was, there is no kinder or gentler word for it, a fool.”

External videos
- Booknotes interview with Deborah Shapley on Promise and Power, 21 March 1993, C-SPAN

In 1993, Washington journalist Deborah Shapley published a 615-page biography of Robert McNamara titled Promise and Power: The Life and Times of Robert McNamara. Shapley concluded her book with these words: "For better and worse McNamara shaped much in today's world—and imprisoned himself. A little-known nineteenth century writer, F.W. Boreham, offers a summation: 'We make our decisions. And then our decisions turn around and make us.'"

The Fog of War: Eleven Lessons from the Life of Robert S. McNamara is a 2003 Errol Morris documentary consisting mostly of interviews with Robert McNamara and archival footage. It went on to win the Academy Award for Documentary Feature. The particular structure of this personal account is accomplished with the characteristics of an intimate dialogue. As McNamara explains, it is a process of examining the experiences of his long and controversial period as the United States Secretary of Defense, as well as other periods of his personal and public life.

== Personal life ==
McNamara married Margaret Craig, his teenage sweetheart, on 13 August 1940. She was an accomplished cook, and Robert's favorite dish was reputed to be her beef bourguignon. Margaret McNamara, a former teacher, used her position as a Cabinet spouse to launch a reading program for young children, Reading Is Fundamental, which became the largest literacy program in the country. She died of cancer in 1981. Later that summer, her ashes were scattered by her family on a mountainside meadow at Buckskin Pass, near Snowmass Village, Colorado.

The couple had two daughters and a son. Their son, Robert Craig McNamara, who as a student objected to the Vietnam War, is a farmer in California.

=== At Ford ===
When working at Ford Motor Company, McNamara resided in Ann Arbor, Michigan, rather than the usual auto executive domains of Grosse Pointe, Birmingham, and Bloomfield Hills. He and his wife sought to remain connected with a university town (the University of Michigan) after their hopes of returning to Harvard after the war were put on hold.

=== Alumnus of the Year ===
In 1961, he was named Alumnus of the Year by the University of California, Berkeley.

=== Attempted assault ===
External videos
- Booknotes interview with Paul Hendrickson on The Living and the Dead: Robert McNamara and Five Lives of a Lost War, 27 October 1996, C-SPAN

On 29 September 1972, a passenger on the ferry to Martha's Vineyard recognized McNamara on board and attempted to throw him into the ocean. McNamara declined to press charges. The man remained anonymous but was interviewed years later by author Paul Hendrickson, who quoted the attacker as saying, "I just wanted to confront (McNamara) on Vietnam."

=== Final years and death ===
After his wife's death, McNamara was rumored to be dating Katharine Graham, with whom he had been friends since the early 1960s. Graham died in 2001.

In September 2004, McNamara wed Diana Masieri Byfield, an Italian-born widow who had lived in the United States for more than 40 years. It was her second marriage. She was married to Ernie Byfield, a former OSS officer and Chicago hotel owner, thirty years her senior, whose first wife, Gladys Rosenthal Tartiere, leased her 400-acre (1.6 km^{2}) Glen Ora estate in Middleburg, Virginia, to John F. Kennedy during his presidency.

At the end of his life, McNamara was a life trustee on the Board of Trustees of the California Institute of Technology (Caltech), a trustee of the Economists for Peace and Security, a trustee of the American University of Nigeria, and an honorary trustee for the Brookings Institution.

McNamara died at his home in Washington, D.C., at 5:30 am on 6 July 2009, at the age of 93. He is buried at the Arlington National Cemetery in Arlington County, Virginia, with the grave marker also commemorating his wives.

McNamara's papers from his years as Secretary of Defense are housed in the John F. Kennedy Presidential Library and Museum in Boston, Massachusetts.

== In Popular Culture ==
McNamara appears in the video game Call of Duty: Black Ops as both a non-playable character in the campaign and as a playable protagonist in the iconic Zombies map "Five."

In the Steven Spielberg film The Post, he is portrayed by actor Bruce Greenwood.

In the film Thirteen Days, he is portrayed by actor Dylan Baker.

== See also ==
- List of Eagle Scouts
- List of Presidential Medal of Freedom recipients
- List of United States political appointments that crossed party lines
- Robert McNamara as Secretary of Defense § See also

== Bibliography ==
Articles

- "World Population Growth." The Journal of Social, Political, and Economic Studies, Summer 1977, pp. 115–118.
- "A New International Order and Its Implications for U.S. Foreign and Defense Policy." The PSR Quarterly, Vol. 3, No. 4, December 1993, pp. 178–182. Features Daniel Ellsberg's handwritten notes.

Books

- McNamara, Robert S. (1968). The Essence of Security: Reflections in Office. New York: Harper & Row.
- One Hundred Countries, Two Billion People: The Dimensions of Development. New York: Praeger, 1973.
- The McNamara Years at the World Bank: Major Policy Addresses of Robert S. McNamara, 1968-1981. Forewords by Helmut Schmidt and Léopold Senghor. Baltimore, MD: Published for the World Bank by the Johns Hopkins University Press, 1981.
- Blundering Into Disaster: Surviving the First Century of the Nuclear Age. New York: Pantheon Books, 1986.
- Out of the Cold: New Thinking for American Foreign and Defense Policy in the 21st Century. New York: Simon & Schuster, 1989.
- McNamara, Robert S.; VanDeMark, Brian (1995). In Retrospect: The Tragedy and Lessons of Vietnam. New York: Times Books. ISBN 978-0679767497.
- Argument Without End: In Search of Answers to the Vietnam Tragedy. New York: Public Affairs Press, 1999.
- Wilson's Ghost: Reducing the Risk of Conflict, Killing, and Catastrophe in the 21st Century. New York: Public Affairs Press, 2001.
- McNamara, Robert (2004). Britain, Nasser and the Balance of Power in the Middle East, 1952-1977: From The Egyptian Revolution to the Six Day War. Routledge & CRC Press. ISBN 978-0714653976.

Memoranda

- McNamara, Robert (February 19, 1968a). "Memorandum for the President, 19 February 1968". Khe Sanh Declassified Documents.

Transcripts

- McNamara, Robert S. (June 1962). "The No-Cities Doctrine: University of Michigan Commencement".
- Civil Defense Role in U.S. Strategic Defensive Forces Outlined for Congress by Secretary McNamara. Washington, D.C.: U.S. Department of Defense, 1966.
- McNamara, Robert S. (May 18, 1966). "Security in the Contemporary World" (PDF).
- The Challenges for Sub-Saharan Africa. Washington, D.C.: Sir John Crawford Memorial Lecture, 1985.
- The Changing Nature of Global Security and its Impact on South Asia. Washington, D.C.: Washington Council on Non-Proliferation, 1992.

== Media ==
See Robert McNamara as Secretary of Defense § Media for the full list.

Documentary films

- Morris, Erroll (2003). The Fog of War: Eleven Lessons from the Life of Robert S. McNamara. YouTube. The Fog of War: Transcript.

Political offices
Preceded by Thomas Gates	United States Secretary of Defense; 1961–1968	Succeeded by Clark Clifford
Diplomatic posts
Preceded by George Woods	President of the World Bank Group; 1968–1981	Succeeded by Tom Clausen
Business positions
Preceded by Henry Ford II	President of the Ford Motor Company; November 9, 1960 – January 1, 1961	Succeeded by John Dykstra
