= Norton Garfinkle =

American economist (1931–2025)

- Born: February 26, 1931
- Died: March 20, 2025 (aged 94)
- Education: Columbia University
- Occupations: Economist and writer

Norton Garfinkle (February 26, 1931 – March 20, 2025) was an American economist, writer, and businessman.

He is a Phi Beta Kappa graduate from Columbia University and did graduate work at Columbia University and Princeton University. He taught economics and economic history at Amherst College, where he was an editor the Journal of Economic History.

== Business career ==
Norton Garfinkle is chairman of Princeton Scientific Capital Management, a financial investment company. He is also chairman of Princeton SciTech, an investment company that specializes in building new internet-based technology companies.

Garfinkle was the founder of Brand Rating Research Corporation, a public opinion research company that provided a syndicated service to many consumer product companies including Procter & Gamble, Bristol Myers and Colgate, major television networks, major national magazines and major newspapers. The company also created RADAR, the first national radio ratings service. The company was sold to Silicon Valley–based Arcata National Corporation in 1970.

Garfinkle was chairman of Electronic Retailing Systems International which provided technology solutions to supermarket chains including the widely used self checkout supermarket systems. The company was sold to IBM in 2003.

Garfinkle founded Advanced Retail Marketing Corporation, an in-store marketing company, which was sold to News Corporation in 1996.

Garfinkle was Chairman of Cambridge Parallel Processing, which provided the super-computers that managed the Reuters News Service.

Garfinkle founded Oral Research Laboratories in 1985. Garfinkle was chairman and CEO of the company until 1988 when the company was sold to Pfizer.

== Chairmanships ==
Garfinkle is Chairman of the Future of American Democracy Foundation, a nonprofit, nonpartisan foundation in partnership with Yale University Press and the Yale Center for International and Area Studies, "dedicated to research and education aimed at renewing and sustaining the historic vision of American democracy". He is also a board member and chairman of the Finance Committee of the Public Agenda, a non-partisan, non-profit, public opinion research organization founded by Secretary of State Cyrus Vance and Social Scientist, Daniel Yankelovich.

He also was chairman of the George Washington University Institute for Communitarian Policy Studies, chairman of the National Hospice Foundation, Chairman of the Lamaze Institute for Family Education, chairman of the New York Landmarks Conservancy and chairman of the Finance Committee of the Harlem School of Arts.

== Broadcast appearances ==
On July 19, 2001, he appeared on the PBS show, The NewsHour with Jim Lehrer, to discuss his report on reforming the voting systems used in the 2000 Presidential Election.

On October 6, 2006, he appeared on the PBS show The Open Mind to discuss his book, The American Dream vs. The Gospel of Wealth.

On February 3, 2007, he was a guest on the Bloomberg on the Economy Radio Report on National Public Radio, in "Norton Garfinkle, Author, Discusses Rise of U.S. Middle Class" discussing his book The American Dream vs. The Gospel of Wealth.

Garfinkle died on March 20, 2025, at the age of 94.

== Selected works ==
- Lincoln and the coming of the Civil War (Problems in American Civilization Series), editor, DC Heath and Company, various editions 1959 - 1967
- Report on Election System Reform, George Washington University, July 2001
- "Effect of Underpricing and Lock-Up Provisions in IPOs", with Burton G. Malkiel and Costin Bontas, The Journal of Portfolio Management, Spring 2002.
- Uniting America: Restoring the Vital Center to American Democracy (The Future of American Democracy Series), editor with Daniel Yankelovich, Yale University Press, 2006 ISBN 0-300-10856-7
- The American Dream vs. The Gospel of Wealth: The Fight for a Productive Middle-Class Economy (The Future of American Democracy Series), Yale University Press, 2006 ISBN 978-0-300-10860-6
