= Ford Foundation =

American private foundation

- Founded: January 15, 1936; 90 years ago
- Founders: Edsel Ford; Henry Ford
- Type: 501(c)(3) charitable organization
- Tax ID no.: 13-1684331
- Location(s): Ford Foundation Building; New York City, U.S.
- Region served: United States, Africa, Latin America, Middle East, Asia
- Method: Grantmaking
- Chairman: Francisco G. Cigarroa
- President: Heather Gerken
- Revenue: US$1 billion (2024)
- Expenses: US$1 billion (2025)
- Endowment: US$16 billion (2025)
- Website: www.fordfoundation.org

The Ford Foundation is an American private foundation with the stated goal of advancing human welfare. Created in 1936 by Edsel Ford and his father Henry Ford, it was originally funded by a $25,000 (about $550,000 in 2023) gift from Edsel Ford. By 1947, after the death of the two founders, the foundation owned 90% of the non-voting shares of the Ford Motor Company; the Ford family retained the voting shares. Between 1955 and 1974, the foundation sold its Ford Motor Company holdings and now plays no role in the automobile company.

In 1949, Henry Ford II created Ford Philanthropy, a separate corporate foundation that to this day serves as the philanthropic arm of the Ford Motor Company and is not associated with the Ford Foundation.

For many years, the Ford Foundation's financial endowment was the largest private endowment in the world; it remains among the wealthiest. For fiscal year 2024, it reported assets of $17.5 billion and expenses of $1.04 billion. In 2025, the foundation approved around 2,000 grants worth more than $973 million.

== Mission ==
After its establishment in 1936, the Ford Foundation shifted its focus from Michigan philanthropic support to five areas of action. In the 1950 Report of the Study of the Ford Foundation on Policy and Program, the trustees set forth five "areas of action", according to Richard Magat (2012): economic improvements, education, freedom and democracy, human behavior, and world peace. These areas of action were identified in a 1949 report by Horace Rowan Gaither.

Since the middle of the 20th century, many of the Ford Foundation's programs have focused on increased under-represented or "minority" group representation in education, science, and policy-making. For over eight decades their mission has decisively advocated and supported the reduction of poverty and injustice, among other values, including the maintenance of democratic values, promoting engagement with other nations, and sustaining human progress and achievement at home and abroad.

The Ford Foundation is one of the primary foundations offering grants that support and maintain diversity in higher education, with fellowships for pre-doctoral, dissertation, and post-doctoral scholarship to increase diverse representation among Native Americans, African Americans, Latin Americans, and other under-represented Asian and Latino sub-groups throughout the U.S. academic labor market. The outcomes of scholarship by its grantees from the late 20th century through the 21st century have contributed to substantial data and scholarship, including national surveys such as the Nelson Diversity Surveys in STEM.

== History ==
The foundation was established on January 15, 1936, in Michigan by Edsel Ford (president of the Ford Motor Company) and two other executives "to receive and administer funds for scientific, educational and charitable purposes, all for the public welfare." It was a reaction to FDR's 1935 tax reform introducing 70% tax on large inheritances. During its early years, the foundation operated in Michigan under the leadership of Ford family members and their associates and supported the Henry Ford Hospital and the Henry Ford Museum and Greenfield Village, among other organizations.

After the deaths of Edsel Ford in 1943 and Henry Ford in 1947, the presidency of the foundation fell to Edsel's eldest son, Henry Ford II. It quickly became clear that the foundation would become the largest philanthropic organization in the world. The board of trustees then commissioned the Gaither Study Committee to chart the foundation's future. The committee, headed by California attorney H. Rowan Gaither, recommended that the foundation become an international philanthropic organization dedicated to the advancement of human welfare and "urged the foundation to focus on solving humankind's most pressing problems, whatever they might be, rather than work in any particular field". The report was endorsed by the foundation's board of trustees, and in 1953 it voted to move the foundation to New York City.

At the height of the Cold War, the Ford Foundation was involved in several covert operations. At least one of these involved the Fighting Group Against Inhumanity (Kampfgruppe gegen Unmenschlichkeit, known as KgU), a CIA-controlled group based in West Berlin that undertook various missions in the East Zone, including intelligence-gathering and sabotage. In 1950, the U.S. government sought to bolster the Fighting Group's legitimacy as a credible independent organization, so the International Rescue Committee was recruited to act as its advocate. With the support of Eleanor Roosevelt, the Ford Foundation was persuaded to give the KgU a grant of $150,000. A press release announcing the grant pointed to the assistance the Fighting Group gave to "carefully screened" defectors to come to the West. The National Committee for a Free Europe, a CIA proprietary, actually administered the grant.

From 1958 to 1965, the Foundation's chairman was John J. McCloy, who in 1942 had founded the Office of Strategic Services, a secretive intelligence agency that became the Central Intelligence Agency. McCloy knowingly employed numerous US intelligence agents and, based on the premise that a relationship with the CIA was inevitable, set up a three-person committee responsible for dealing with its requests. The CIA channeled funds through the Ford Foundation as part of its efforts to influence culture.

Writer and activist Arundhati Roy has said that the foundation, along with the Rockefeller Foundation, supported imperialist efforts by the U.S. government during the Cold War. For example, Roy wrote that the Ford Foundation's establishment of an economics course at the Indonesian University helped align students with the 1965 coup that installed Suharto as president.

The board of directors decided to diversify the foundation's portfolio and gradually divested itself of its substantial Ford Motor Company stock between 1955 and 1974. This divestiture allowed Ford Motor to become a public company. Finally, Henry Ford II resigned from his trustee's role in a surprise move in December 1976. In his resignation letter, he cited his dissatisfaction with the foundation holding on to its old programs, large staff and what he saw as anti-capitalist undertones in the foundation's work. In February 2019, Henry Ford III was elected to the Foundation's Board of Trustees, becoming the first Ford family member to serve on the board since his grandfather resigned in 1976.

The company was a co-founder of National Public Affairs Center for Television in 1971 with Corporation for Public Broadcasting, and was sold to WETA-TV in 1972.

For many years, the foundation topped annual lists compiled by the Foundation Center of US foundations with the most assets and the highest annual giving. The foundation has fallen a few places in those lists, especially with the establishment of the Bill and Melinda Gates Foundation in 2000. As of May 4, 2013, the foundation was second in terms of assets and tenth in terms of annual grant giving.

In 2012, the foundation declared that it was not a research library and transferred its archives from New York City to the Rockefeller Archive Center in Sleepy Hollow, New York.

In 2020, the Ford Foundation issued a bond offering earlier in the year that allowed it to raise $1 billion and thus "substantially increase the amount of money it distributes."

== Grants and initiatives ==
=== Media and public broadcasting ===
In 1951, the foundation made its first grant to support the development of the Public Broadcasting Service (PBS), then known as National Educational Television (NET), which went on the air in 1952. These grants continued, and in 1969 the foundation gave $1 million to the Children's Television Workshop to help create and launch Sesame Street.

=== Fund for Adult Education ===
Active from 1951 to 1961, this subsidiary of the Ford Foundation supported initiatives in the field of adult education, including educational television and public broadcasting. During its existence, the FAE spent over $47 million. Among its funding programs were a series of individual awards for people working in adult education to support training and field study experiences. The FAE also sponsored conferences on the topic of adult education, including the Bigwin Institute on Community Leadership in 1954 and the Mountain Plains Adult Education Conference in 1957. These conferences were open to academics, community organizers, and members of the public involved in the field of adult education.

In addition to grantmaking to organizations and projects, the FAE established its own programs, including the Test Cities Project and the Experimental Discussion Project. The Experimental Discussion Project produced media that was distributed to local organizations to conduct viewing or listening and discussion sessions. Topics covered included international affairs, world cultures, and United States history.

Educational theorist Robert Maynard Hutchins helped to found the FAE, and educational television advocate C. Scott Fletcher served as its president.

=== Arts and free speech ===
The foundation underwrote the Fund for the Republic in the 1950s. Throughout the 1950s, the foundation provided arts and humanities fellowships that supported the work of figures like Josef Albers, James Baldwin, Saul Bellow, Herbert Blau, E. E. Cummings, Anthony Hecht, Flannery O'Connor, Jacob Lawrence, Maurice Valency, Robert Lowell, and Margaret Mead. In 1961, Kofi Annan received an educational grant from the foundation to finish his studies at Macalester College in St. Paul, Minnesota.

Under its "Program for Playwrights", the foundation helped to support writers in professional regional theaters such as San Francisco's Actor's Workshop and offered similar help to Houston's Alley Theatre and Washington's Arena Stage.

=== Anti-authoritarianism ===
In 2022, Ford Foundation committed $80 million over the next five years (until 2027) to strengthen nonprofits fighting against authoritarian regimes. The grants will support civil-society groups in virtual "hubs" in 12 countries including South Africa, Tanzania, Uganda, Nigeria, Brazil, Colombia, Costa Rica, Indonesia, Kenya, Lebanon, Mexico, and Peru. The hubs will provide consulting, help the organizations create plans, promote their work, and protect their workers and families from threats.

=== Reproductive rights ===
In the 1960s and 1970s, the foundation gave money to government and non-government contraceptive initiatives to support population control, peaking at an estimated $169 million in the last 1960s. The foundation ended most support for contraception programs by the 1970s.

Between 1969 and 1978, the foundation was the biggest funder for research into in vitro fertilisation in the United Kingdom, which led to the first baby, Louise Brown, born from the technique. The Ford Foundation provided $1,170,194 toward the research.

=== Law school clinics and civil rights litigation ===
In 1968, the foundation began disbursing $12 million to persuade law schools to make "law school clinics" part of their curriculum. Clinics were intended to give practical experience in law practice while providing pro bono representation to the poor. Conservative critic Heather Mac Donald contends that the foundation's financial involvement instead changed the clinics' focus from giving students practical experience to engaging in leftwing advocacy.

In the late 1960s and the 1970s, the foundation expanded into civil rights litigation, granting $18 million to civil rights litigation groups. The Mexican American Legal Defense and Educational Fund was incorporated in 1967 with a $2.2 million grant from the foundation. The same year, the foundation funded the establishment of the Southwest Council of La Raza, the predecessor of the National Council of La Raza. In 1972, the foundation provided a three-year $1.2 million grant to the Native American Rights Fund. The same year, the Puerto Rican Legal Defense and Education Fund opened with funding from numerous organizations, including the foundation. In 1974, the foundation contributed funds to the Southwest Voter Registration Education Project.

=== New York City public school decentralization ===
In 1967 and 1968, the foundation provided financial support for decentralization and community control of public schools in New York City. Decentralization in Ocean Hill–Brownsville led to the firing of some white teachers and administrators, which provoked a citywide teachers' strike led by the United Federation of Teachers.

=== Ford Foundation Symphony Program ===
From 1966 through 1976, to encourage the growth and stability of symphony orchestras across the USA and Puerto Rico, the Ford Foundation invested $80.2 million to: (1) improve orchestra artistic quality, (2) strengthen orchestra finances, and (3) raise the income and prestige of the music profession in the U.S. Sixty-one American symphony orchestras participated in the unprecedented ten-year Ford Foundation Symphony Program. Part of the "Big Bang" of music philanthropy, the Symphony Program represented the single largest gift program ever devised for the arts. The Symphony Program infused cash into orchestra budgets throughout the nation resulting in increased orchestra seasons and musician wages. But many orchestras could not sustain the economic growth provided by the Symphony Program grant. According to one author, orchestra managers had to "manufacture" work to sustain the longer season which, in turn, generated "boredom and apathy" among professional symphony musicians.

=== Fellowship programs ===
The foundation began awarding postdoctoral fellowships in 1980 to increase the diversity of the nation's academic faculties. In 1986, the foundation added predoctoral and dissertation fellowships to the program. The foundation reports awarding 130 to 140 fellowships annually, and by 2013 there were 4,300 living fellows from over 22 countries. The University of California, Berkeley was affiliated with 346 fellows at the time of award, the most of any institution, followed by the University of California, Los Angeles at 205, Harvard University at 191, Stanford University at 190, and Yale University at 175. The 10-campus University of California system accounts for 947 fellows, and the Ivy League is affiliated with 726. Over a period of 15 years, Ford invested over $350 million in fellowships. In 2022, the foundation announced that it would be sunsetting the program.

In October 2020, Ford Foundation partnered with the Andrew W. Mellon Foundation to establish the Disability Future Fellowship, awarding $50,000 annually to disabled writers, actors, and directors in the fields of creative arts performance.

Launched in 2020, the Ford Global Fellowship is a $50 million, 10-year program (active until 2030) designed to fund individuals attempting to address global inequality.

=== Infectious diseases ===
In 1987, the foundation began making grants to fight the AIDS epidemic and in 2010 made grant disbursements totaling $29,512,312.

In June 2020, Ford Foundation decided to raise $1 billion through a combination of 30 and 50- year bonds. The main aim was to help nonprofits hit by the pandemic.

=== Impact investing ===
According to Fast Company in 2018, "Ford spends between $500 million and $550 million a year to support social justice work around the world. But last year, it also pledged to plow up to $1 billion of its overall $12.5 billion endowment over the next decade into impact investing via mission-related investments (MRIs) that generate both financial and social returns." Former Foundation president Darren Walker wrote in a 2015 New York Times op-ed that the grant-making philanthropy of institutions like the Ford Foundation "must not only be generosity, but justice." Walker added that the Ford Foundation seeks to address "the underlying causes that perpetuate human suffering" to grapple with and intervene in "how and why" inequality persists. In 2020, the Ford Foundation announced $180 million new grants to support racial justice and civil rights groups.

=== Movement for Black Lives ===
In July 2016, following high-profile police shootings and nationwide protests, the Ford Foundation announced an initiative to support the Movement for Black Lives (M4BL). M4BL is a decentralized network of grassroots organizations that formed around the #BlackLivesMatter movement. Ford pledged over $40 million in six-year capacity-building grants to M4BL organizations, and announced it aimed to raise $100 million. Ford partnered with Borealis Philanthropy, the Movement Strategy Center, and Benedict Consulting to create and underwrite the pooled donor fund Black-Led Movement Fund (BLMF). Over 50 organizations donated to the fund, including social justice funders such as George Soros's Open Society Foundations, the NoVo Foundation, the Hill-Snowdon Foundation, and Solidaire to strengthen the infrastructure, technology, and organizational sustainability of young, diverse Black-led movements across the United States.

=== BUILD Program ===
The BUILD (Building Institutions and Networks) program was an 11-year, nearly $2 billion initiative launched in 2015. It provided over 560 social justice nonprofits globally across 47 countries with grants. The program gave out five-year grants ranging from $2 million to $10 million. It concluded in December 2025.

=== The Heartland Initiative ===
In 2022, the Ford Foundation launched the Heartland Initiative with $40 million funding. Its grantmaking goal is to increase philanthropic investment across the US Midwest, the American South, Appalachia, and rural areas. Despite representing approximately 20% of the US population, rural and regional communities historically receive less than 7% of overall philanthropic funding. Core funding focus areas include economic development and local ownership, civic infrastructure, community infrastructure, clean water, and telehealth. In partnership with the Rural Investment in Action Foundation (RIIF), the foundation established multi-million dollar funds to support small businesses and train emerging fund managers in Appalachia.

=== Creative Futures ===
During the COVID-19 pandemic and the Black Lives Matter movement in 2020, the Ford Foundation commissioned 40 "provocations" from creatives and thinkers who work in various fields in the arts and culture, including documentary film and journalism. Written submissions relate to "reimagining of the fundamental ways in which culture and media operate", including funding, place, the future of making art, and novel paradigms, such as a cooperative model of sharing resources.

The pieces written by the contributors have been published by both the Ford Foundation and other organizations, such as the arts magazine Hyperallergic, the Smithsonian Asian Pacific American Center, and the International Documentary Association. Contributors include Coco Fusco, Sofía Gallisá, Craig Santos Perez, Chris E. Vargas, Marc Bamuthi Joseph, Aaron Dworkin, and Shaun Leonardo.

=== America's Cultural Treasures ===
In 2020, the Ford Foundation launched America's Cultural Treasures, a joint effort with other philanthropists and foundations to pledge over $165 million to help "arts organizations run by people of color" after the COVID-19 pandemic.

=== Israel and Palestine ===
In April 2011, the foundation announced that it would cease its funding for programs in Israel as of 2013. It had provided $40 million to nongovernmental organizations in Israel since 2003 exclusively through the New Israel Fund (NIF), in the areas of advancing civil and human rights, helping Arab citizens in Israel gain equality and promoting Israeli-Palestinian peace. The grants from the foundation were roughly a third of NIF's donor-advised giving, which totaled about $15 million a year.

In 2003, the foundation was critiqued by US news service Jewish Telegraphic Agency, among others, for supporting Palestinian nongovernmental organizations accused of promoting antisemitism at the 2001 World Conference Against Racism. Under pressure by several members of Congress, chief among them Representative Jerrold Nadler, the foundation apologized and then prohibited promotion of "violence, terrorism, bigotry or the destruction of any state" among its grantees. This move itself sparked protest among university provosts and various nonprofit groups on free speech grounds.

The foundation's partnership with the New Israel Fund (NIF), which began in 2003, was criticized for its choice of mostly progressive grantees and causes. This criticism peaked after the 2001 World Conference Against Racism, where some nongovernmental organizations the foundation funded backed resolutions equating Israeli policies with apartheid. In response, the Ford Foundation tightened its criteria for funding. In 2011, right-wing Israeli politicians and organizations such as NGO Monitor and Im Tirtzu claimed the NIF and other recipients of Ford Foundation grants supported the delegitimization of Israel.

The Ford Foundation announced in October 2023 that it would no longer provide grants to Alliance for Global Justice, a nonprofit with alleged "Palestinian terrorism ties". "Ford has no plans to support any Alliance for Global Justice projects in the future and it is not eligible for any other funding", a spokeswoman for the foundation said, adding, "We will not be funding them in the future".

== Ford Foundation Center for Social Justice ==
Ford Foundation Building in New York City

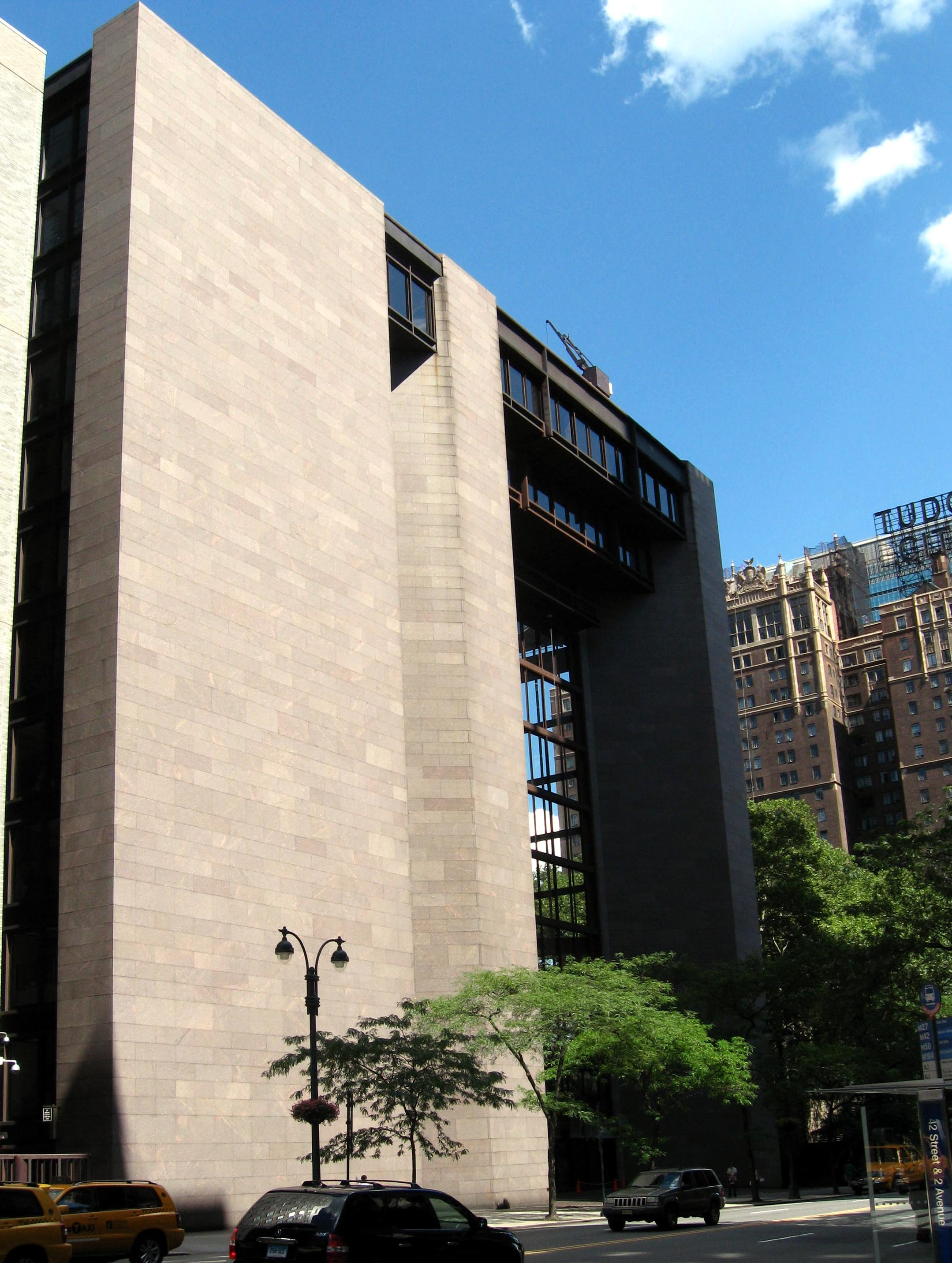
Exterior of the building

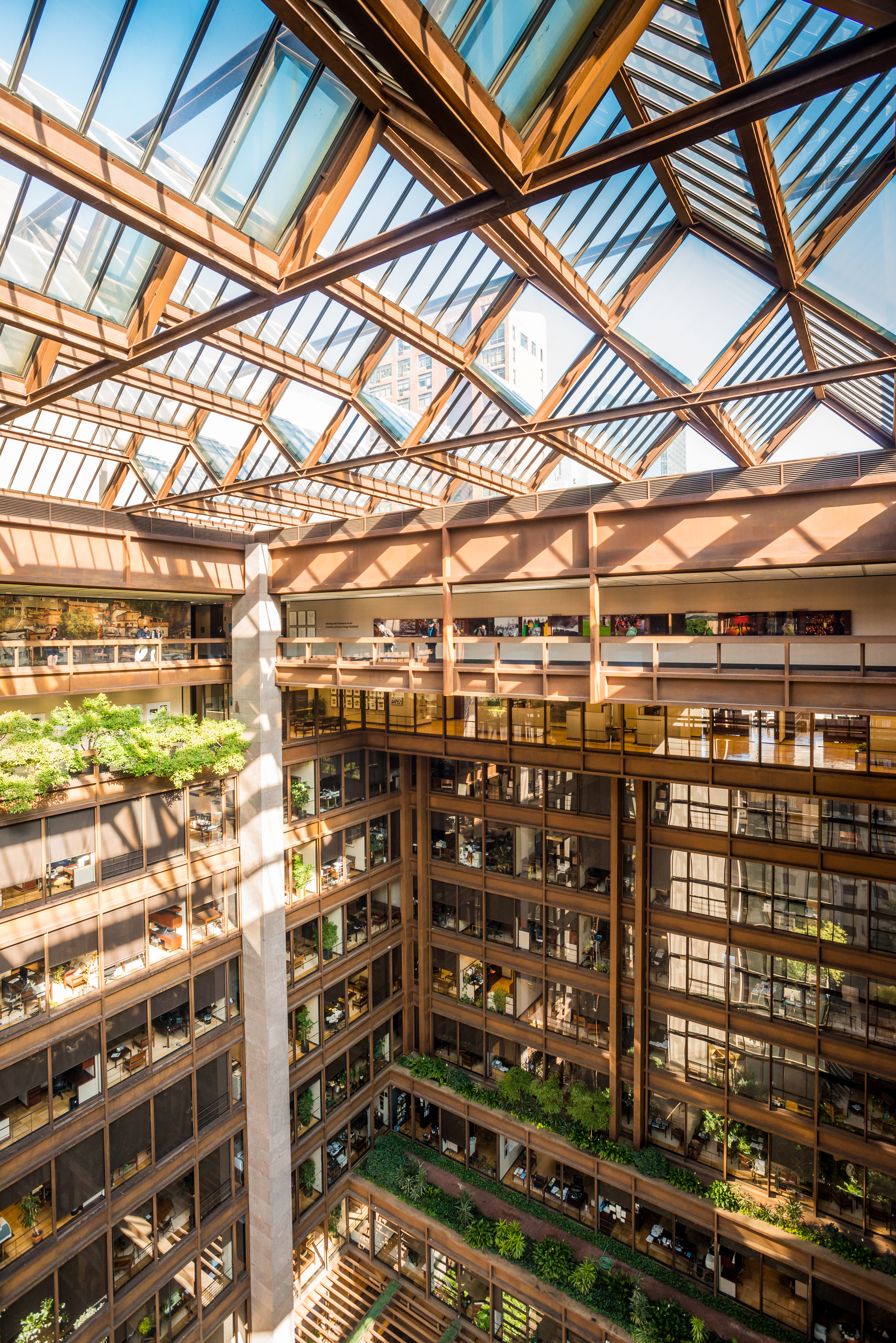
Atrium with garden

Completed in 1968 by the firm of Roche-Dinkeloo, the Ford Foundation Center for Social Justice in New York City (originally the Ford Foundation Building) was the first large-scale architectural building in the country to devote a substantial portion of its space to horticultural pursuits. Its atrium was designed with the notion of having urban greenspace accessible to all and is an example of the application in architecture of environmental psychology.

The building, 321 E. 42nd St., was recognized in 1968 by the Architectural Record as "a new kind of urban space". This design concept was used by others for many of the indoor shopping malls and skyscrapers built in subsequent decades. The New York City Landmarks Preservation Commission designated the building a landmark in 1997.

== Presidents ==
- Edsel Ford (founder): 1936–1943
- Henry Ford II: 1943–1950
- Paul G. Hoffman: 1950–1953
- H. Rowan Gaither: 1953–1956
- Henry T. Heald: 1956–1965
- McGeorge Bundy: 1966–1979
- Franklin Thomas: 1979–1996
- Susan Berresford: 1996–2007
- Luis Ubiñas: 2008–2013
- Darren Walker: 2013–2025
- Heather Gerken: 2025–

Source: "History of Ford Foundation"

== See also ==
- List of projects of the Ford Foundation
- Andrew Carnegie Foundation
- Contemporary Music Project
- Council on Foreign Relations
- Fair Mortgage Collaborative
- Financial endowment
- Foundation (nonprofit)
- Hilary Pennington
- John J. McCloy
- Rockefeller Foundation
