= Sigma I-66 war game =

The Sigma I-66 war game was one of a series of classified high level war games played in The Pentagon during the 1960s to strategize the conduct of the burgeoning Vietnam War. Sigma I-66 was based on the unrealistic scenario of a famine-stricken and militarily diminished North Vietnam agreeing to de-escalate its war efforts. It ended with a hypothetical force of 100,000 Viet Cong still in South Vietnam.

== Pentagon usage of war games ==
These war game simulations were designed to replicate then-current conditions in Indochina, with an aim toward predicting future foreign affairs events. They were staffed with high-ranking officials standing in to represent both domestic and foreign characters; stand-ins were chosen for their expertise concerning those they were called upon to represent. The games were supervised by a Control appointed to oversee both sides. The opposing Blue and Red Teams customary in war games were designated the friendly and enemy forces as was usual; however, several smaller teams were sometimes subsumed under Red and Blue Teams. Over the course of the games, the Red Team at times contained the Yellow Team for the People's Republic of China, the Brown Team for the Democratic Republic of Vietnam, the Black Team for the Viet Cong, and Green for the USSR.

Preparation for these simulations was quite extensive. A game staff of as many as 45 people researched and developed the scenarios. The actual play of the war game involved 30 to 35 participants. There are four or five simulations per year, solicited secretively from the State Department, the Central Intelligence Agency, and major military commands.

== Playing the game ==
Sigma I-66 was staged in September 1966. Its focus was managing de-escalation of the war if the communists were willing to begin negotiating instead of fighting. In the video-taped summary of the game, a briefer notes that it was believed that the Vietnamese communist insurrection would dwindle into nothingness as they had previously in Greece and Malaya.

The basis for Sigma I-66 was an imagined North Vietnam suffering from food shortages caused by a typhoon destroying the rice crop. The People's Army of Vietnam were being defeated in South Vietnam. American air strikes had beggared the north. Ho Chi Minh secretly passes a private message to the Americans. He proposes withdrawal of northern troops from the south, and a ceasefire from the Viet Cong. In return, he wants a ceasefire from the Americans, a halt to the bombing campaign, a graduated withdrawal of American forces, and free elections in South Vietnam.

This scenario was played out in an aura of disbelief. Game Control forced Blue Team to cease the air attacks on the north. Control also has to rule out a Red Chinese invasion of the north. As the simulation ended, the Viet Cong representative in the game noted: "That's like the cops giving up shooting in shooting in agreement with the robbers. You're turning the countryside back over to the Viet Cong. You have not explained...how you are going to get rid of a hundred thousand...armed Viet Cong...."

General Earle Wheeler ended the exercise with the comment: "I'm afraid some cynics might be tempted to rediscover that there are worse things than war."

== See also ==
- Sigma war games
- Sigma I-62 war game
- Sigma I-63 war game
- Sigma I-64 war game
- Sigma II-64 war game
- Sigma I-65 war game
- Sigma II-65 war game
- Sigma II-66 war game
- Sigma I-67 and II-67 war games
