= Sigma I-64 war game =

The Sigma I-64 war game, one of the Sigma war games, was played from 6 to 9 April 1964. Its purpose was to test scenarios of escalation of warfare in Vietnam. After rigorous research into information needed to form a scenario, a simulation took place, with knowledgeable officials playing out the roles of actual government decision makers. Participants were drawn from the State Department, Department of Defense, the Central Intelligence Agency, and the Joint Chiefs of Staff. In Sigma I-64, the scenarios to be examined were the burgeoning Viet Cong insurgency in Vietnam, and the possible use of U.S. air power against it.

The conclusion drawn from the game was that American air power would have little effect on the Viet Cong because they needed only 15 tons of supplies daily to survive and fight.

== Overview ==
The Sigma I-64 war game was one of a series of classified high level war games played in the Pentagon during the 1960s, codenamed Sigma, to strategize concerning the conduct of the burgeoning Vietnam War. All of these games were designed to replicate conditions in Indochina, with an aim toward predicting future foreign affairs events. The opposing Blue and Red Teams customary in war games were designated the friendly and enemy forces as was usual; however, several smaller teams were sometimes subsumed under Red and Blue Teams.

Preparation for these simulations was quite extensive. A game staff of as many as 45 people researched and developed the scenarios. The actual play of the war game involved 30 to 35 participants. There are usually four or five simulations per year, with the ideas for scenarios solicited surreptitiously from the State Department, the Central Intelligence Agency, and major military commands.

== Background ==
Sigma I-64 was played between 6 and 9 April 1964. It was designed to test secretive scenarios of escalation of warfare in Vietnam, including a gradually increasing bombing campaign. The concept of a massive Chinese intervention like in the Korean War was a major consideration to be explored.

== Set up ==
The exercise was staffed by the State Department, Department of Defense, the Central Intelligence Agency, and the Joint Chiefs of Staff. Although working-level government officers played the actual simulation, cabinet-level senior advisors reviewed the resulting policy conclusions.

=== Participants ===
Participants were high-ranking officials standing in to represent both domestic and foreign characters; stand-ins were chosen for their expertise concerning those they were called upon to represent. The games were supervised by a Control appointed to oversee both sides.

The Blue Team in Sigma I-64 represented both the United States and South Vietnam. Its players included:

- National Security Advisor McGeorge Bundy
- Chief of Staff of the United States Army General Earle G. Wheeler
- Director of Central Intelligence John A. McCone
- Chief of Staff of the United States Air Force General Curtis LeMay
- Assistant Secretary of Defense for International Security Affairs John McNaughton

The Red Team represented the communist nations of the People's Republic of China, the Democratic Republic of Vietnam, the Viet Cong, and the Pathet Lao. Participants for the Red Team are unknown. The Red Team at times contained the Yellow Team for the People's Republic of China, the Brown Team for the Democratic Republic of Vietnam, the Black Team for the Viet Cong, and Green for the USSR.

== Simulation ==
The projected start date for the game was 15 June 1964. The hypothetical triggering incident was a U.S. flier being shot down and captured, exposing America's role in the stealthily escalating war. Deputy United States Secretary of State Seymour Weiss critiqued the war game thus: "The eventual capture of a US airman is a high probability and would give 'hard' evidence of US involvement". Coincidentally, in reality it turned out that U.S. Navy pilot Charles Frederick Klusmann was actually shot down over the Kingdom of Laos on 6 June 1964 to become the first American aviator downed.

A summary of the war game results noted that intervention in Vietnam would "lay a basis" for similar actions against Cuba. Because the Viet Cong insurgency was within the internationally acceptable limits of covert warfare, an open war waged against them would become an actual war. As a response, the Soviet Union and the People's Republic of China could be expected to change their methods of Cold War opposition to the United States. Adverse public opinion both domestic and foreign would plague the U.S. as a result.

One conclusion to be drawn was that air power would have little effect on North Vietnam's ability to wage war. It was concluded that the North Vietnamese had to ship only 15 tons per day of military supplies to the Viet Cong to maintain the southern insurrection. Even more dismaying, despite a commitment of a projected 500,000 American troops to fighting in Vietnam, the communists were deemed to have won. Prominent military historian H. R. McMaster terms the results as "eerily prophetic".

== Results ==
In Sigma I-64's wake, Robert McNamara disregarded the war game results in favor of an analytically statistical approach. Walter Rostow argued that American air power need not destroy the North Vietnamese ability to support an insurrection in South Vietnam, but only discourage that support. A follow-up war game, Sigma II-64, was scheduled to test his theory.

== See also ==
- Robert McNamara as Secretary of Defense § Downing of Charles Klusmann over Laos
- Sigma war games
