= Sigma II-65 war game =

The Sigma II-65 war game was one of a series of classified high level war games played in the Pentagon during the 1960s to strategize the conduct of the burgeoning Vietnam War. It was held between 26 July and 5 August 1965. The games were designed to replicate then-current conditions in Indochina, with an aim toward predicting future foreign affairs events. They were staffed with high ranking officials standing in to represent both domestic and foreign characters; stand-ins were chosen for their expertise concerning those they were called upon to represent. The games were supervised by a Control appointed to oversee both sides. The opposing Blue and Red Teams customary in war games were designated the friendly and enemy forces as was usual; however, several smaller teams were sometimes subsumed under Red and Blue Teams. Over the course of the games, the Red Team at times contained the Yellow Team for the People's Republic of China, the Brown Team for the Democratic Republic of Vietnam, the Black Team for the Viet Cong, and Green for the USSR.

Preparation for these simulations was quite extensive. A game staff of as many as 45 people researched and developed the scenarios. The actual play of the war game involved 30 to 35 participants. There were four or five simulations per year, solicited secretively from the State Department, the Central Intelligence Agency, and major military commands.

== Background ==
On 23 July 1965, the U.S. Intelligence Board released Special National Intelligence Estimate 10-9-65. The opinion of the U.S. intelligence community was an escalation in American ground forces in South Vietnam would be countered by increased infiltration of northern troops to brace the Viet Cong. An increase in air attacks on North Vietnam would lead to their acquisition of more anti-aircraft defenses from the USSR. Only if the communists were losing were they expected to negotiate a ceasefire.

== Simulation ==
Sigma II-65 was held by the Joint Chiefs of Staff between 26 July and 5 August 1965. It was designed to explore the situation in Vietnam from perspectives other than those of the Americans and the Vietnamese communists. Four previous Sigma war games—I-63, I-64, II-64, and I-65—had foreseen that bombing North Vietnam while committing U.S. ground forces into combat in South Vietnam would lead to retaliatory increased American casualties.

For Sigma II-65, the Blue Team represented both the U.S. and South Vietnam. The Red Team was designated as North Vietnam. Other communist factions were Black Team for the Viet Cong, Yellow Team for China, and Green Team for the USSR.

Blue Team played with the aim of quickly ending the war. The Red and Black Teams settled down for a long conflict; they were content to curb their military moves and concentrate on undercutting the South Vietnamese regime through terrorism and destruction of the South's economy.

== Conclusion and results ==
Final report of politico-military game SIGMA II-65

As the simulation ended on 5 August 1965, the chairman of the State Department's Policy Planning Council, Walt Rostow, forwarded a memorandum to his fellow Sigma II-65 player William Bundy. In it he noted that prolonged commitment of U.S. forces with a steady drain of casualties in an indecisive war would frustrate the American public. He believed air attacks on the north were a critical variable in U.S. strategy. His solution was to prepare for a supervised election in the south.

That same day, General Maxwell Taylor predicted that the communists’ offensive would be defeated by year's end, though this shouldn’t be mistaken for a US victory. Rather, it was a return to the stalemate that had held prior to fall 1964. "By the end of 1965, the North Vietnamese offensive will be bloodied and defeated without having achieved major gains....1965 could be a decisive year." Senior U.S. officials reviewed and discussed a video summary of the game's proceedings at game's end. The difficulties of engaging a wily, evasive foe, and the minimal effect of bombing on the North Vietnamese economy were discussed. The Sigma II-65 final report was issued on 20 August. The results of the simulation predicted that so long as the communists maintained the guerrilla tactic of picking when they wished to fight, and they had safe haven over the borders of Cambodia and Laos, they would not suffer sufficient casualties to end the war. Both bombing campaigns then in progress, Operation Rolling Thunder and Operation Barrel Roll were deemed to have limited effect on communist operations. General William Westmoreland's strategy, as expressed in his 1 September 1965 mission statement was based on attrition warfare. The Sigma II-65 results contradicted that attrition could win the war; as a result, Secretary of Defense Robert McNamara began to doubt Westmoreland's expertise.

== See also ==
- Sigma war games
