= Sigma I-67 and II-67 war games =

1960s American military war games about Vietnam

The Sigma I-67 and II-67 War Games were two of a series of classified high level war games played in the Pentagon during the 1960s to strategize the conduct of the burgeoning Vietnam War. The games were designed to replicate then-current conditions in Indochina, with an aim toward predicting future foreign affairs events. They were staffed with high-ranking officials standing in to represent both domestic and foreign characters; stand-ins were chosen for their expertise concerning those they were called upon to represent. The games were supervised by a Control appointed to oversee both sides. The opposing Blue and Red Teams customary in war games were designated the friendly and enemy forces as was usual; however, several smaller teams were sometimes subsumed under Red and Blue Teams. Over the course of the games, the Red Team at times contained the Yellow Team for the People's Republic of China, the Brown Team for the Democratic Republic of Vietnam, the Black Team for the Viet Cong, and Green for the USSR.

Preparation for these simulations was quite extensive. A game staff of as many as 45 people researched and developed the scenarios. The actual play of the war game involved 30 to 35 participants. There are four or five simulations per year, solicited secretively from the State Department, the Central Intelligence Agency, and major military commands. The Sigma I-67 and Sigma II-67 war games were played concurrently; with two simulations playing two teams simultaneously, there were over 100 participants.

== Background ==
Both the Sigma I-67 and Sigma II-67 Top Secret politico-military war games were staged concurrently between 27 November and 7 December 1967. The simulations were played between 0900 and 1800 hours in Pentagon chambers provided by the Joint War Games Agency of the Joint Chiefs of Staff. The Sigma games' focus was on settling the Vietnam War rather than winning it. Despite this change of focus, there was ample experience with these simulations, given the precedent set by prior Sigma games dating back to 1962.

Both Sigma I-67 and Sigma II-67 were assigned a Control. Either game had both a Blue and a Red Team. The Blue Team in either game represented the United States, although a pair of its players were designated as the Government of Vietnam (GVN). Either Red Team played as the North Vietnamese communists in their respective games; they also each had a two-man detachment appointed as the South Vietnamese communists. Control's functions included playing other nations and global organizations. Control also served as the link between the opposing sides via messaging.

== Agencies and participants ==
- The White House: Maxwell Taylor, three supporting players
- The Secretary of Defense: Assistant Secretary of Defense for International Security AffairsPaul Warnke, Phil G. Goulding, ten others
- State Department players: Deputy Assistant Secretary of State for East Asian and Pacific Affairs Philip C. Habib, 13 other players
- The Joint Chiefs of Staff: General Earle Wheeler, General William E. DePuy, 14 military officers, one civilian player
- The Central Intelligence Agency: Eight players
- The Defense Intelligence Agency: LtG Joseph F. Carroll, five others
- The National Security Agency: LtG Marshall S. Carter, an aide
- Pacific Command: Four officers
- The U.S. Army: General Ralph E. Haines, Jr., four junior officers
- The U.S. Air Force: General Bruce K. Holloway, two junior officers
- The U.S. Marine Corps: Commandant of the Marine Corps Wallace M. Greene, two junior officers
- The U.S. Navy: Admiral Horacio Rivero, Vice Admiral Waldemar F. A. Wendt, two junior officers
- The U.S. Information Agency: Six players
- The Agency for International Development: Five players
- The U.S. Treasury Department: Three players
- American University, the Institute for Defense Analyses: Two players each
- The National War College: LtG Andrew Goodpaster
- New York University, the Arms Control and Disarmament Agency, SRI International, Columbia University, The Rand Corporation, Harvard University: All sent one player apiece
- Total of participants listed above: 105.

== Beginning scenario ==
Game scenarios were based on extensive research into the ongoing events that the war games were going to simulate. Both games began their simulations from the same scenario set on the same future date. The U.S. Blue Team purportedly receives a confidential message from the Democratic Republic of Vietnam on 25 January 1968, proposing a basis for negotiations to end the Vietnam War. If the United States will quit bombing their country, the Red Team communists will meet in a third party's capital to arrange a settlement. On 2 February 1968, the Blue Team secretly agrees to halt their bombing campaign, although still maintaining aerial surveillance over the north and suffering numerous consequent losses. In turn, Red Team uses the respite to reconstruct their bombed lines of communication.

=== Sigma I-67 ===
Hidden in the Sigma I-67 scenario, and withheld from Blue Team, was Red Team's secret determination to make gains at Blue Team's expense via any possible bargaining, no matter how cynical. At one point, a Red Team member stated: "We had no good faith whatsoever."

=== Sigma II-67 ===
Red Team played with a different implicit set of hidden imperatives for Sigma II-67. Unbeknownst to Blue, Red's military force in South Vietnam was thrashed. Its Russian and Chinese sponsors in the proxy war were slacking their support. There was internal dissension in the northern populace. Therefore, on 2 February 1968, when the U.S. covertly agreed to halt bombing North Vietnam, Red pushed for an extension of the ongoing Tết holiday ceasefire. Blue had already considered and rejected that move; instead, it maintained its military operations against the communists.

== Simulations played ==
=== Sigma I-67 ===
Red Team quickly amassed its troops in North Vietnam and infiltrated not only South Vietnam, but Cambodia and Laos. In the meantime, they carried on negotiations as a distracting political tactic as they feverishly rebuilt destroyed infrastructure.

As its move, Blue Team abandoned its search and destroy tactics and dispersed its ground troops into small units protecting the South Vietnamese populace. The bombing effort now focused on the South.

Red Team's counterattacks on these village security units revealed the shallowness of Red's commitment to settlement talks. However, they felt it necessary to try to force American troops back into larger centralized units. They also repatriated their air defense MiG fighters from the People's Republic of China as the North's airfields were repaired.

Blue now found itself hampered in its negotiating stance by Thai and South Korean allies clamoring for a say in any ceasefire. Also, the GVN quietly messaged the North Vietnamese communists to inform them that any deals made without southern participation would not be recognized by the GVN.

Red also found itself in trouble with its ally. China threatened an end to its military aid, stationed a fighter wing and two divisions on its Vietnamese border, and slowed Soviet military aid transiting its territory.

Despite these obstacles, Control decreed negotiations would begin on 7 March 1968 in Paris. Agenda items were de-escalation, a ceasefire, withdrawal of troops, and exchange of prisoners of war. However, the GVN players on Blue Team balked. They were ready to sabotage the talks; they wanted to preserve the South's territory, worried that they might be forced into coalition government with the Viet Cong, and feared a premature withdrawal of U.S. forces.

The Red Team now changed to demanding that American forces had to withdraw from Vietnam before the communists would cease firing. The ultimatum named 4 June 1968 as a deadline; after that date, Red would re-initiate hostilities with the aim of raising the U.S. casualty rate enough to arouse the American public.

Blue concluded by electing to resume the air offensive if negotiations were unsuccessful. However, that resumption was subject to influence by public opinion. Control introduced a congressional resolution that prohibited hostile military moves against Red while talks were in progress.

=== Sigma II-67 ===
Red Team began its simulation plagued by political dissidence by the National Liberation Front for South Vietnam in the Mekong Delta. The NLF in the Delta tried to sabotage the negotiations. Blue Team's opening move was a rejection of the idea of dispersing forces into village security units. It was believed that the tactic might lead to defeat of some of the village security units, as well as allowing the Viet Cong to re-form into larger units for operations. In turn, Blue redirected its air power so it struck entirely in the South.

Having had its push for a post-Tet ceasefire denied, the North Vietnamese were desperate for a formal ceasefire before negotiations began. They made a token withdrawal of a brigade back into the North while pulling other troops back from combat into sanctuaries. On 13 February 1968, a four party meeting among the warring parties began in Yangon. Game Control then mandated a military stand-down by both sides.

The U.S. continued aerial surveillance of the North while suppressing communist guerrilla activity in the Mekong Delta. It also began to convert the irregulars of the Civilian Irregular Defense Group program (CIDG) into constabulary. In the meantime, formal talks in Yangon quickly settled the matter of repatriating wounded prisoners of war. Further discussion was scheduled between Red and Blue on 1 March 1968. Onsite were also outside observers from the USSR, United Kingdom, Kingdom of Thailand, Republic of Korea, Australia, and New Zealand.

Although both teams harbored disagreements within their ranks, Control bent the course of the play toward talks. The mediators glossed over GVN non-cooperation and the Viet Cong attempt to undercut its own side. The fighting in South Vietnam had dwindled; Blue moved into civic action programs by its troops. On 28 April 1968, the Rangoon Conference adjourned, leaving subcommittees to work out procedures for a continuing truce, troop reductions and withdrawals, and the integration of the NLF into Southern politics.

Most importantly, the two sides agreed to internationally supervised elections for South Vietnam's Constituent Assembly on 1 July 1968. Primary elections for government office would be held on 1 August. General elections would follow on 1 September. On 1 October, the Assembly would start writing a new constitution for South Vietnam. Blue demanded majority election of every Assembly member, believing that most favorable to their aims. It also offered to remove its troops from Vietnam six months later. Although the Red Team was willing to hold elections under the existing South Vietnamese constitution, Blue insisted on adoption of a new constitution that would favor its side.

== End results ==
=== Sigma I-67 ===
The consensus was that Red Team made considerable gains while playing out their scenario. They revitalized their military forces. An influx of Third World technicians was judged to inhibit resumption of U.S. air strikes for the fear of causing collateral damage casualties. On the other hand, Blue Team was wracked by dissension within its ranks and under pressure by the U.S. public for a speedy peace.

=== Sigma II-67 ===
By 28 April 1968, Blue Team had come to doubt Red's sincerity in negotiations. Blue's ranks were split over the question of whether NLF participation in South Vietnamese politics would inevitably lead to a takeover by the communists, and about the chances of success in an election. In any case, the United States overrode its South Vietnamese ally. The South Vietnamese were content to let the Americans take the brunt of the fighting while they provided security to their fellow citizens.

== Debriefing conclusions ==
All four teams from both war games debriefed simultaneously. Common conclusions were that even a token withdrawal from Vietnam by the U.S. would spark pressure to continue the exodus. It was also felt that withdrawal would be a one-way exit for the Americans. The game's director decided that the two sides were unlikely to arrange a ceasefire, and that a unilateral truce by the U.S. would fail. It was also believed that the communists would not engage in free elections even in favorable circumstances for fear of losing at the polls.
