= Sigma I-62 war game =

The Sigma I-62 war game, played in February 1962, was the first of a series of classified high level war games played in the Pentagon during the 1960s to strategize the conduct of the burgeoning Vietnam War. These simulations were designed to replicate then-current conditions in Indochina, with an aim toward predicting future foreign affairs events. The conclusion drawn from Sigma I-62 was that American intervention in Vietnam would be unsuccessful.

== Sigma I-62 background ==
The United States gradually sank into its role in Indochina as the French departed. Having assumed the French responsibilities in the region, the U.S. found itself facing a volatile future there. In October 1961, President John F. Kennedy was presented with two potential courses of action in Vietnam. His staff members, Walter Rostow and retired General Maxwell Taylor recommended an increase in military advisers and a commitment of 8,000 U.S. combat troops to South Vietnam. A conflicting recommendation by Secretary of Defense Robert McNamara and the Joint Chiefs of Staff called for committing six American combat divisions, comprising 200,000 soldiers. Kennedy held a decision on combat troops in abeyance, though he forwarded 1,000 added advisers to South Vietnam, including Farm Gate instructors from the Special Air Warfare Center at Eglin Air Force Base.

In Southeast Asia, war was already brewing, as President Dwight D. Eisenhower told incoming President Kennedy at his inauguration. The fear was that Southeast Asian nations could fall into communist hands like dominos. In Laos, the ongoing course of events had already led to the start of the Second Indochina War. Troops of the Royal Lao Government were engaged in a slow motion battle at the Luang Namtha near the Chinese border as 1961 turned into 1962.

== Sigma I-62 game play ==
In February 1962, some members of the Joint Chiefs of Staff secretly war-gamed the unfolding situation in Southeast Asia. American interests were represented by the Blue Team, communist adherents by the Red Team. The opposing Blue and Red Teams customary in war games were designated the friendly and enemy forces as was usual; however, several smaller teams were sometimes subsumed under Red and Blue Teams. Over the course of Sigma I-62, the Red Team at times contained the Yellow Team for China, the Brown Team for the Democratic Republic of Vietnam, the Black Team for the Viet Cong, and Green for the USSR.

Preparation for war game simulations was quite extensive. A game staff of as many as 45 people researched and developed the scenarios. The actual play of the war game involved 30 to 35 participants. They were staffed with high-ranking officials standing in to represent both domestic and foreign characters; stand-ins were chosen for their expertise concerning those they were called upon to represent. The game was supervised by a Control appointed to oversee both sides. As the Control Team, McGeorge Bundy and Maxwell Taylor umpired.

From the beginning, Blue Team admitted that because of the communist head start in hidden guerrilla warfare, civic action programs were curbed. The war game director noted, "...it appears that Red wanted to win without a war while Blue wanted not to lose also without a war." The conclusion drawn from Sigma I-62 was that American intervention in Vietnam would be unsuccessful.

Sigma I-62 was held over three years before American combat troops were landed in Vietnam, and two and a half years prior to the Tonkin Gulf Incident. It was the first in a series of wargames in the Sigma series run through the 1960s, most of which showed the US losing the war or locked in a stalemate with a deteriorating home front. In later years, results of Sigma war games would be dubbed "eerily prophetic".
