= First Corps Area =

- Active: 20 August 1920 – 7 December 1941
- Country: United States of America
- Branch: United States Army
- Type: Military District
- Role: Training
- Part of: Department of War
- Garrison/HQ: Boston, MA

The First Corps Area was a Corps area (effectively a military district) of the United States Army. It replaced the Northeastern Department, and was headquartered at South Boston Army Base, Massachusetts. The organization included Army units and facilities in Maine, Massachusetts, New Hampshire, Rhode Island, Vermont, and Connecticut. It was responsible for the mobilization, and administration of the First United States Army (1936–38); the Fourth Army, I Army Corps with 9th, 26th, and 43d Divisions; XI Corps, constituted 29 July 1921, with the 76th, 94th, and 97th Division; coast defense units of the First Coast Artillery District, some units of the GHQ Reserve, and the Zone of the Interior support units of the First Corps Area Service Command. First Corps Area was redesignated First Corps Area Service Command (CASC) in May 1941.

The First Corps Area Training Center was established in the Regular Army on 7 July 1921, and was organized on 9 November 1921 with headquarters at Fort Andrews, Massachusetts. The headquarters was moved to Fort Warren, Massachusetts, on 19 December 1921. The training center's training group, at Camp Devens, Massachusetts, conducted training and demonstration functions for Regular Army, National Guard, and Organized Reserve units, ROTC cadets, and CMTC candidates. The depot group consisted of an illiterate and development section, and a conventional recruit training section for new Regular Army recruits for units stationed in the First Corps Area. Originally, training for all arms and services except cavalry and field artillery was to be accomplished at Camp Devens, while cavalry and field artillery were to train at Fort Ethan Allen, Vermont. The First Corps Area Training Center was

discontinued on 8 July 1922. Camp Devens then became the primary training center for corps area infantry units only. Air corps units were sent to Mitchel Field, New York, engineer units to Fort DuPont, Delaware; and signal corps units were sent to Camp Alfred Vail (later renamed Fort Monmouth), New Jersey. Corps area maneuvers of Regular Army mobile units were held, those years when funds were available, near Fort Ethan Allen.

With the adoption of the four field army plan on 1 October 1933, the mobile units of the First Corps Area were reassigned to the First Army or GHQ Reserve, or were demobilized.

In May 1941, the Corps Area became the First Corps Area Service Command (CASC). Major General Francis B. Wilby was the commanding general from 15 July 1941–11 January 1942. Soon afterwards, the Assistant Chief of Staff, G-2, Brigadier General Sherman Miles, marked for his directorate's intelligence failure before the Attack on Pearl Harbor, was promoted to major general but then given the relatively unimportant command of First CASC. First CASC was again redesignated First Service Command, part of the Second World War Army Service Forces, on 22 July 1942. By 1943, it had a strength of 31,246. Miles retained command throughout the war and until his retirement from the Army on February 28, 1946.

First Service Command became an area command under the new First Army (United States) in mid 1946. General Ira T. Wyche commanded First Service Command until January 1947.

== Commanders 1920−1946 ==
First Corps Area

- Major General David C. Shanks (September 1, 1920-June 30, 1921)
- Major General Clarence R. Edwards (June 30, 1921–December 1, 1922)
- Brigadier General Mark L. Hersey (December 1, 1922–January 1, 1922)
- Major General Andre W. Brewster (January 1, 1922–November 28, 1925)
- Brigadier General John D. Barette (November 28, 1925–January 2, 1926)
- Major General Preston Brown (January 2, 1926–March 9, 1930)
- Brigadier General Meriwether L. Walker (March 9, 1930–October 7, 1930)
- Major General Fox Conner (October 7, 1930–September 30, 1938)
- Major General William H. Wilson (October 1, 1938–February 3, 1939)
- Brigadier General Joseph M. Cummins (February 3, 1939–March 13, 1939)
- Major General James A. Woodruff (March 13, 1939–June 10, 1941)

First Corps Area Service Command

- Major General Francis B. Wilby (July 15, 1941–January 11, 1942)

First Service Command

- Major General Sherman Miles (January 28, 1942–February 28, 1946)
- Major General Ira T. Wyche (May 1946–30 January 1947)
