= Sigma I-63 war game =

Sigma I-63 was one of the series of Sigma war games. Sigma I-63 was scheduled for June of 1963 to be run by the Joint Wargames Agency at a Secret level, played by the interagency, and looking at Indonesia/Malaysia. According to a 1966 Quarterly Bulletin published by the Joint Wargames Agency, Sigma I-63 was cancelled before it could be run.

These were a series of classified high level war games played in the Pentagon during the 1960s to strategize the conduct of the burgeoning Vietnam War. These simulations were designed to replicate then-current conditions in Indochina, with an aim toward predicting future foreign affairs events. They were staffed with high-ranking officials standing in to represent both domestic and foreign characters; stand-ins were chosen for their expertise concerning those they were called upon to represent. The games were supervised by a Control appointed to oversee both sides. The opposing Blue and Red Teams customary in war games were designated the friendly and enemy forces as was usual; however, several smaller teams were sometimes subsumed under Red and Blue Teams. Over the course of the games, the Red Team at times contained the Yellow Team for the People's Republic of China, the Brown Team for the Democratic Republic of Vietnam, the Black Team for the Viet Cong, and Green for the USSR.

Preparation for these simulations was quite extensive. A game staff of as many as 45 people researched and developed the scenarios. The actual play of the war game involved 30 to 35 participants. There are four or five simulations per year, solicited secretively from the State Department, the Central Intelligence Agency, and major military commands.

In his memoirs, Ambassador William H. Sullivan recalls being a participant in Sigma I-63; however, it is likely he is actually referring to either of the Sigma 64 series or the Sigma 62 game--both of which he played in. His recollection is that the game ended in a fictional 1970 with 500,000 American troops locked in a stalemate in Vietnam, and conscription riots in the United States.

== See also ==
- Sigma war games
