= Sigma II-64 war game =

The Sigma II-64 war game was one of a series of classified high level war games played in The Pentagon during the 1960s to strategize the conduct of the burgeoning Vietnam War. The games were designed to replicate then-current conditions in Indochina, with an aim toward predicting future foreign affairs events. They were staffed with high-ranking officials standing in to represent both domestic and foreign characters; stand-ins were chosen for their expertise concerning those they were called upon to represent. The games were supervised by a Control appointed to oversee both sides. The opposing Blue and Red Teams customary in war games were designated the friendly and enemy forces as was usual; however, several smaller teams were sometimes subsumed under Red and Blue Teams. Over the course of the games, the Red Team at times contained the Yellow Team for the People's Republic of China, the Brown Team for the Democratic Republic of Vietnam, the Black Team for the Viet Cong, and Green for the USSR.

Preparation for these simulations was quite extensive. A game staff of as many as 45 people researched and developed the scenarios. The actual play of the war game involved 30 to 35 participants. There were four or five simulations per year, solicited secretively from the State Department, the Central Intelligence Agency, and major military commands.

== Sigma II-64 ==
=== Setup ===
Sigma II-64 was scheduled as a followup to Sigma I-64. It was designed, run, and umpired by the RAND Corporation. It was posed to answer three concerns of the U.S. military: Would bombing the Democratic Republic of Vietnam hinder its support of the southern insurgency? Conversely, would it help the south? And would it affect joint operations by the People's Army of Vietnam and the Viet Cong?

Sigma II-64 was staged in the Pentagon in Room BC942A, a highly secure venue, by the Joint War Games Agency. As the war game was staged between 8 and 17 September 1964, it was held in the wake of the Tonkin Gulf Incident that officially began the Vietnam War.

Rather unusually, the Red and Blue Teams were now split to reflect both decisions and results. Each team had a Senior Policy Team and an Action Team appointed. These four teams were overseen by Control, acting as Command Authority. Sigma II-64 was attended by participants from an even greater variety of agencies than Sigma I.

=== Participants ===
Most identities of the role playing assignments are redacted from the record. Agencies represented, and known individual participants, were:

Agencies represented:

- President of the United States
- Office of the Secretary of Defense
- Pacific Command
- Defense Intelligence Agency
- Military Assistance Command Vietnam
- State Department
- Central Intelligence Agency
- Joint Chiefs of Staff

Known Blue Team participants:

- National Security Advisor McGeorge Bundy
- Chairman of the Joint Chiefs of Staff General Earle G. Wheeler
- Director of Central Intelligence John A. McCone
- Chief of Staff of the United States Air Force General Curtis LeMay
- Assistant Secretary of Defense for International Security Affairs John McNaughton
- Deputy Secretary of Defense Cyrus Vance
- Vice Chief of Naval Operations Admiral Horacio Rivero Jr

Known Red Team participants:

- Deputy Director of the Central Intelligence Agency Ray S. Cline (tasked with slanting game towards Chinese goals)
- Deputy Assistant Secretary for Defense Harry Rowen (assigned the role of Ho Chi Minh)
- Chief of Staff of the United States Army General Harold K. Johnson

=== Starting scenario ===
The aim of the war game was to recommend a course of action for the developing war. Teams would meet at 15:00 hours on 10, 15, and 17 September 1964. The war game began on 10 September with a starting scenario briefing of the Action Teams. In turn, the Action Teams briefed their respective Policy Teams. The Blue Policy Team was tasked to consider three major items. One was whether an offer to send Nationalist Chinese troops to Vietnam should be accepted. Another was whether the U.S. needed to resort to a partial or complete wartime mobilization to fight the war. Most importantly, the teams were charged with considering the use of nuclear weapons in Vietnam.

For Sigma II-64, the participants were briefed on events of the Vietnam War to date. Then a hypothetical start date of 12 April 1965 was selected to begin the action. This opening scenario closely copied current events:

On the military front, the Red Team decided that China reinforced the North Vietnamese and beefed up their air defense system. Roads were being constructed between China and Laos. North Vietnamese infiltration into South Vietnam had swelled Viet Cong ranks to 40,000 men. A military mission was posted to Cambodia.

On the political front, a weak South Vietnamese government clung to power. Red Team exploited this by positing that China would attempt a diplomatic offensive directed at Burma and Japan, while the French would call for a peace conference. Even as more U.S. advisers and Special Forces were poured into the effort, and air support augmented, casualties increased. An offer of three Nationalist Chinese divisions for Blue Team's use in Vietnam was rejected.

Working on a near future chronology, it was then forecast that joint divisional maneuvers on the North Korean and Chinese border took place in a hypothetical November 1964. Chinese "volunteer" MiG pilots joined the North Vietnamese, while three brigades of North Vietnamese regulars filtered into South Vietnam's six northernmost provinces. By the imagined January 1965, the Viet Cong's National Liberation Front had set up a provisional government; it was recognized by Socialist nations. On the projected date of 26 February 1965, the President of the United States directed a Marine Expeditionary Force to Vietnam, ordered construction of a permanent base at Danang, and expanded air operations against the communists. Lastly, on a future 1 April 1965, Buddhist rioting in South Vietnam would divide their military as there were calls for General Nguyễn Khánh to resign as head of the government. With this final instruction, the scenario was set for the 12 April 1965 start of Sigma II-64.

=== War game play ===
Blue Team's opening moves on the projected 12 April closely paralleled contingency plans already written. With its announced objective of defending freedom in South Vietnam, the U.S. President supposedly called for partial mobilization of U.S. armed forces to quash the communist insurgency with military force, dispatching an infantry division and an airborne brigade to South Vietnam. Additionally, he sent three air force squadrons and three infantry divisions to Thailand. Two aircraft carrier groups were forwarded to the scene. The Commander in Chief of the Pacific Command asked for authorization to use tactical nuclear weapons in extreme cases, and was denied. Hidden in this flurry of action was a secret plan to accept a divided Laos if necessary to end the war.

In turn, the Red Team avoided directly opposing the U.S., instead concentrating on politically undermining the South Vietnamese government. Red also mounted a diplomatic offensive against the Thai government, hoping to erode their support for the United States. Militarily, the Viet Cong shelled American-occupied airfields while a Red Chinese division moved into North Vietnam, with an added three divisions on alert.

Blue countered by calling up another six American divisions; in reality, this would take mobilization via a presidential declaration of emergency. Blue also commandeered civilian cargo ships and aircraft to amass sufficient carriage for the projected escalation. An air offensive by Blue was credited with destroying all North Vietnamese targets listed in the war game's initial data base.

Red expanded its air defenses while its propaganda agencies pumped out journalism on the horror of Blue's air raids. This ended the war game play for 10 September. Control had ruled out the entry of Chinese troops on the Red Team's side; it had likewise scotched Blue's use of nuclear weapons.

Day two of Sigma II-64 was deemed to be 15 April 1965, although in reality it was 14 September 1964. This day's war game began with Blue intensifying its aerial campaign on North Vietnam, mining Haiphong harbor, bombing airfields at Haiphong and Phúc Yên, smashing bridges, and demolishing the North's only machine tool plant and its concrete factories. Red infiltration of South Vietnam continued unchecked. McGeorge Bundy's simulation participation was disrupted by an actual coup being attempted against General Nguyễn Khánh in real life.

Red's response was a propaganda coup when the possibility of the use of nuclear weapons by the U.S. was leaked to the world's media. They also shelled the U.S. airfield at Danang. On the future 24 May, an American battalion was ambushed and overrun west of Tchepone, Laos, suffering heavy casualties.

=== Ending ===
By the war game's end on 17 September 1964, Blue was planning amphibious landings in North Vietnam, a confrontation with Chinese troops in northern Laos, and a bombing campaign aimed at select Chinese targets. The Blue Team internally disagreed on the use of nuclear weapons to hit Chinese targets, including their nuclear facilities. However, conventional air strikes were directed against China, and the U.S. faced off against a Chinese division in northern Laos.

Overall, game results were discouraging. Vietnam's agricultural economy was largely self-sustaining, with imported foreign aid supplying its technological needs. With game play so closely paralleling real-life plans and events, it was concluded that raising the necessary American troops would require a state of national emergency within the United States. The increase in manpower would come at the expense of lessened domestic political support. It would take another military action as prominent as the Tonkin Gulf incident to justify that escalation. Most importantly, Sigma II-64's results undercut the basic assumption that a gradually escalating aerial campaign could lead to U.S. victory. The actual conclusion was that bombing would stiffen the North Vietnamese will to resist.

It was noted that President Johnson could actually duplicate Blue Team's moves. Johnson wished to fight the Vietnam War as a means of containing communist China, despite his policy makers' game results; they feared a flood of Chinese "volunteers" into Vietnam.

For his part, General Curtis LeMay recommended a sharp, overwhelming aerial campaign of 16 days waged against 96 crucial targets in North Vietnam. He based his recommendations on the historical precedent of World War II bombing campaigns. However, the game showed that signaling the communists via differing levels of military aggression was unworkable because hostilities spiraled upwards.

Although the Sigma II-64 results foresaw the failure of a bombing campaign that gradually increased the force of its attacks, just such a campaign would be launched in Operation Rolling Thunder.

== See also ==
- Sigma war games
