= Francis Bowditch Wilby =

United States Army general (1883–1965)

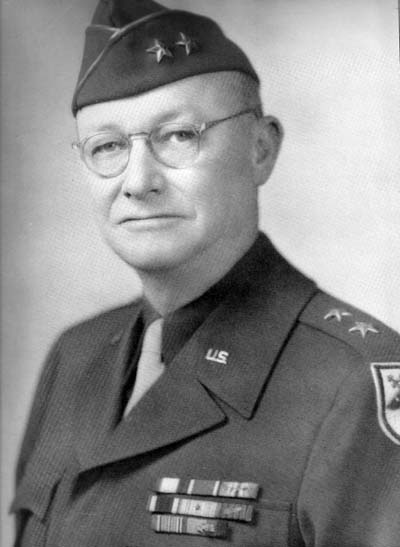
- Francis B. Wilby as a major general
- Born: April 24, 1883; Detroit, Michigan, U.S.
- Died: November 20, 1965 (aged 82); Asheville, North Carolina, U.S.
- Military career
- Allegiance: United States
- Branch: United States Army
- Service years: 1905–46
- Rank: Major General
- Commands: Superintendent of the USMA
- Conflicts: US occupation of Cuba; World War I World War II
- Awards: Distinguished Service Medal (2); Legion of Merit

Francis Bowditch Wilby (April 24, 1883 – November 20, 1965) was a major general in the United States Army who served as the 39th Superintendent of the United States Military Academy from 1942 to 1945, during World War II.

== Early years and WW I ==
Francis Bowditch Wilby was born on April 24, 1883, in Detroit, Michigan. Raised in Deerfield, Massachusetts, he graduated from the Deerfield Academy. Wilby then attended the United States Military Academy at West Point, New York and graduated third in the Class of 1905. He was commissioned as a second lieutenant in the Corps of Engineers on June 13, 1905.

Wilby was promoted to the rank of first lieutenant on June 7, 1907, and in September of the same year, he was ordered to the Washington, D.C., where he attended the Engineer School at Washington Barracks (now Fort Lesley J. McNair).

Wilby also served with the United States forces during the United States occupation of Cuba between years 1906–1909.

When the U.S. entered World War I in April 1917, Wilby was transferred to France with the American Expeditionary Force. His first assignment with the AEF was as the Instructor of 1st Corps Engineer School in Gondrecourt-le-Château. He also attended the French engineer school at Chalons-sur-Marne. On March 20, 1918, Wilby was transferred to the Chaumont-Porcien Headquarters of the American Expeditionary Force, where he was appointed as Chief of Engineers Intelligence Division in the Office of Chief of Engineers. On September 26, 1918, Wilby was transferred to the 1st Division under command of Major General Charles Pelot Summerall, where he was appointed as a Commander of 1st Engineers. Wilby stayed in this capacity until March 14, 1919, where he was ordered back to the United States.

For his distinguished service during World War I, Wilby was awarded with Army Distinguished Service Medal by the Government of the United States and with the Croix de Guerre with Palm of the Government of France.

=== Distinguished Service Medal Citation ===
The official U.S. Army citation for Wilby's Distinguished Service Medal reads:

General Orders: War Department, General Orders No. 14 (1923)
Action Date: World War I
Name: Francis Bowditch Wilby
Service: Army
Rank: Colonel
Company: Chief Engineer
Division: American Expeditionary Force
Citation: The President of the United States of America, authorized by Act of Congress, July 9, 1918, takes pleasure in presenting the Army Distinguished Service Medal to Colonel (Corps of Engineers) Francis Bowditch Wilby (ASN: 0-2023), United States Army, for exceptionally meritorious and distinguished services to the Government of the United States, in a duty of great responsibility during World War I. As Assistant in charge of Military Engineering in the Office of the Chief Engineer, American Expeditionary Forces, and later as Division Engineer of the 1st Division, Colonel Wilby displayed unusual ability and professional attainments of a high order. As Editor of the Engineer Field Notes, and as the author of a large number of them, his clear conception of the functions and duties of Engineer troops was most firmly impressed upon the Combat Engineers and contributed in a signal manner to their marked efficiency. By his rare technical skill and knowledge, keen adaptability to all conditions, he contributed materially to the success of the 1st Division in a position of great responsibility and in times and circumstances of the gravest importance.

== Between wars ==
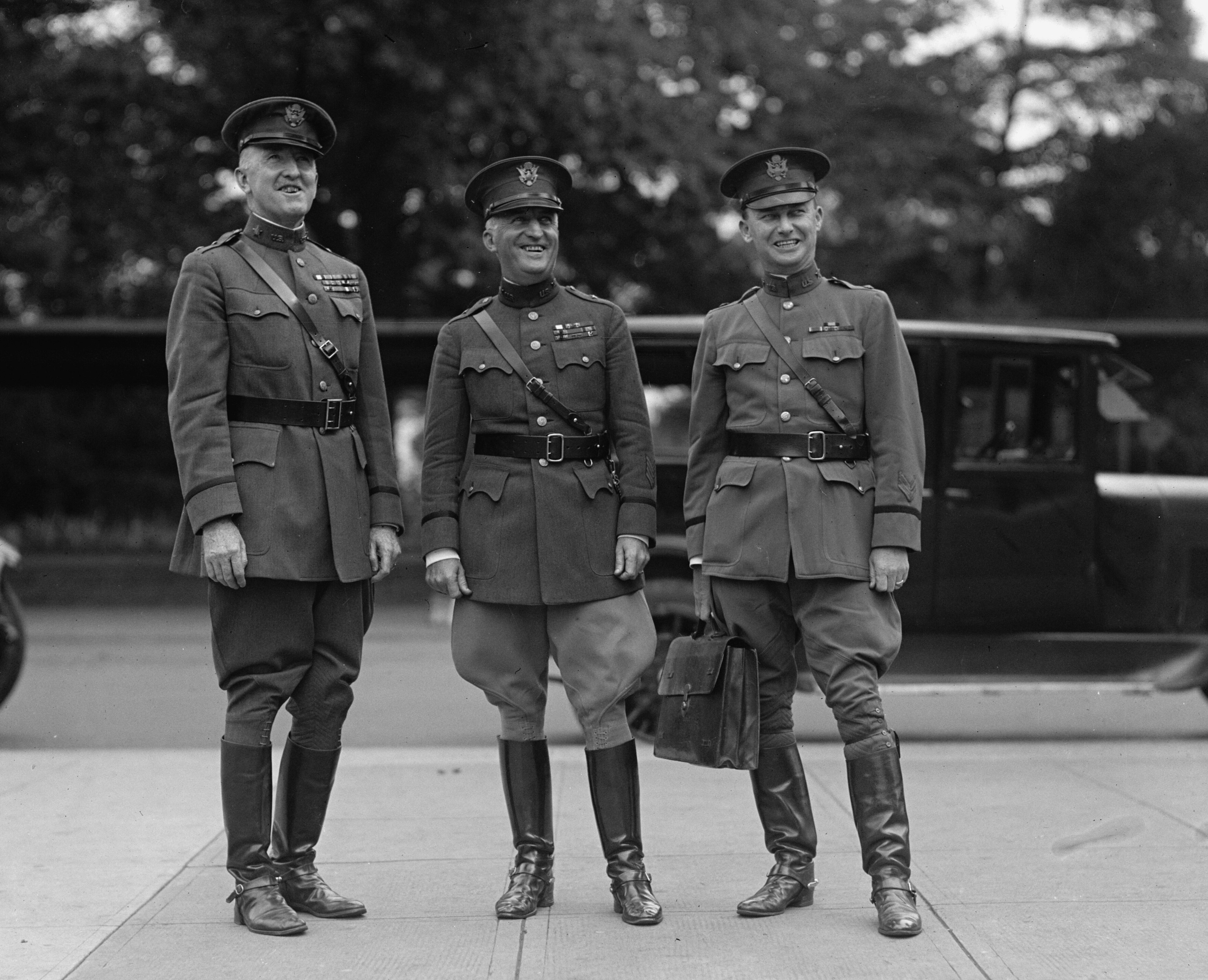
Major General John L. Hines, Brigadier General Hugh A. Drum and Major Francis B. Wilby at Capitol Hill, 1925.

Wilby graduated from the School of the Line in 1922, the General Staff School in 1923, and the Army War College in 1924. He then served on the War Department General Staff from 1924 to 1928.

Wilby was transferred to Governors Island, New York, where he was appointed as a chief of staff of the First United States Army under the command of Lieutenant General Hugh A. Drum on October 26, 1939. He was also promoted to the rank of brigadier general on October 1, 1940.

== World War II ==
In July 1941, Wilby was appointed as the commanding general of the First Corps Area Service Command, just renamed from First Corps Area. Wilby was promoted to the rank of major general on September 29, 1941.

On January 13, 1942, Wilby was selected to be appointed as Superintendent of the United States Military Academy and stayed in this capacity for the whole of World War II until September 4, 1945.

His last military assignment was at Fort Belvoir in Fairfax County, Virginia, where he served as a commander of the Engineer school until January 31, 1946, when he finally retired from the Army.

== Retirement ==
After his retirement from the Army, Wilby was appointed as a chairman of the New York Power Authority and served in this capacity until 1950. Then he worked as a consultant engineer of the Knappen Tibbetts Abbeit Company until his final retirement in 1952.

Wilby settled in Asheville, North Carolina and died on November 20, 1965, at the age of 82 at the Oteen Veterans' Administration Hospital. He is buried at the United States Military Academy Post Cemetery in West Point, New York, together with his first wife Dorothy Langfitt Wilby (1887–1948). His second wife Olive Logan (Emerson) Payne (1896–1983) was buried beside them after her death.

== Decorations ==
Here is the ribbon bar of Major General Wilby:

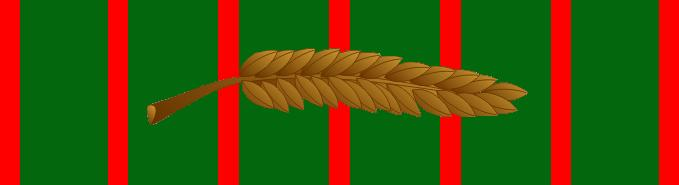

1st Row	Army Distinguished Service Medal with Oak Leaf Cluster		Legion of Merit	
2nd Row	Army of Cuban Pacification Medal	World War I Victory Medal with five Battle Clasps	Army of Occupation of Germany Medal	American Defense Service Medal with Base Clasp
3rd Row	American Campaign Medal	World War II Victory Medal	French Croix de Guerre 1914–1918 with Palm	Ecuador Order of Abdon Calderón 1st Class

Military offices
Preceded by Robert L. Eichelberger	Superintendent of the United States Military Academy; 1942–45	Succeeded by Maxwell D. Taylor
