= Sigma I-65 war game =

The Sigma I-65 war game was one of a series of classified high level war games played in The Pentagon during the 1960s to strategize the conduct of the burgeoning Vietnam War. These simulations were designed to replicate then-current conditions in Indochina, with an aim toward predicting future foreign affairs events. They were staffed with high-ranking officials standing in to represent both domestic and foreign characters; stand-ins were chosen for their expertise concerning those they were called upon to represent. The games were supervised by a Control appointed to oversee both sides. The opposing Blue and Red Teams customary in war games were designated the friendly and enemy forces as was usual; however, several smaller teams were sometimes subsumed under Red and Blue Teams. Over the course of the games, the Red Team at times contained the Yellow Team for the People's Republic of China, the Brown Team for the Democratic Republic of Vietnam, the Black Team for the Viet Cong, and Green for the USSR.

Preparation for these simulations was quite extensive. A game staff of as many as 45 people researched and developed the scenarios. The actual play of the war game involved 30 to 35 participants. There are four or five simulations per year, solicited secretively from the State Department, the Central Intelligence Agency, and major military commands.

== Sigma I-65 ==
While earlier Sigma War Games had considered whether U.S. combat troops should be committed to the Vietnam War, Sigma I-65 was held just after U.S. Marines had landed in Danang, Republic of South Vietnam on 8 March 1965.

Sigma I-65 was held in May 1965. Players on both Blue and Red Teams were lower level officials, while higher ranking advisors set policy for their teams. Nothing more is yet known of this exercise.

== See also ==
- Sigma war games
