= Maxwell D. Taylor =

United States Army general (1901–1987)

- Official portrait, c. 1957

Chair of the President's Intelligence Advisory Board
- In office 29 February 1968 – 1 May 1970
- President: Lyndon B. Johnson; Richard M. Nixon
- Preceded by: Clark Clifford
- Succeeded by: George Whelan Anderson Jr.

United States Ambassador to South Vietnam
- In office 14 July 1964 – 30 July 1965
- President: Lyndon B. Johnson
- Preceded by: Henry Cabot Lodge Jr.
- Succeeded by: Henry Cabot Lodge Jr.

Chairman of the Joint Chiefs of Staff
- In office 1 October 1962 – 1 July 1964
- President: John F. Kennedy; Lyndon B. Johnson
- Preceded by: Lyman Lemnitzer
- Succeeded by: Earle Wheeler

Chief of Staff of the Army
- In office 30 June 1955 – 30 June 1959
- President: Dwight D. Eisenhower
- Deputy: Williston B. Palmer; Lyman Lemnitzer
- Preceded by: Matthew Ridgway
- Succeeded by: Lyman Lemnitzer

Commander of the United Nations Command
- In office 1 April 1955 – 5 June 1955
- President: Dwight D. Eisenhower
- Deputy: Williston B. Palmer; Lyman Lemnitzer
- Preceded by: John E. Hull
- Succeeded by: Lyman Lemnitzer

Superintendent of the United States Military Academy
- In office 4 September 1945 – 28 January 1949
- Preceded by: Francis Bowditch Wilby
- Succeeded by: Bryant Moore

Personal details
- Born: Maxwell Davenport Taylor; 26 August 1901 Keytesville, Missouri, U.S.
- Died: 19 April 1987 (aged 85) Washington, D.C., U.S.
- Education: United States Military Academy (BS); Metropolitan Community College, Missouri

Military service
- Allegiance: United States
- Branch/service: United States Army
- Years of service: 1922–1959; 1961–1964
- Rank: General
- Unit: Engineer Branch; Field Artillery Branch
- Commands: Chairman of the Joint Chiefs of Staff; Chief of Staff of the United States Army; United States Military Academy; 101st Airborne Division; 82nd Airborne Division Artillery; 12th Field Artillery Battalion
- Battles/wars: World War II; Italian campaign; Operation Husky; Allied invasion of Italy; Operation Overlord; Battle of Normandy; Battle of Carentan; Operation Market Garden; Battle of the Bulge; Siege of Bastogne; Occupation of Japan; Korean War; Vietnam War
- Awards: Distinguished Service Cross; Army Distinguished Service Medal (4); Silver Star (2); Legion of Merit; Bronze Star Medal; Purple Heart

Maxwell Davenport Taylor (26 August 1901 – 19 April 1987) was a senior United States Army officer and diplomat during the Cold War. He served with distinction in World War II, most notably as commander of the 101st Airborne Division, nicknamed "The Screaming Eagles."

After the war, he served as the fifth chairman of the Joint Chiefs of Staff, having been appointed by President John F. Kennedy. Taylor, along with Secretary of Defense Robert McNamara, played a major role during the early days of the Vietnam War in the decision to deploy US combat troops to Vietnam and to escalate the conflict more generally.

== Early life and career ==
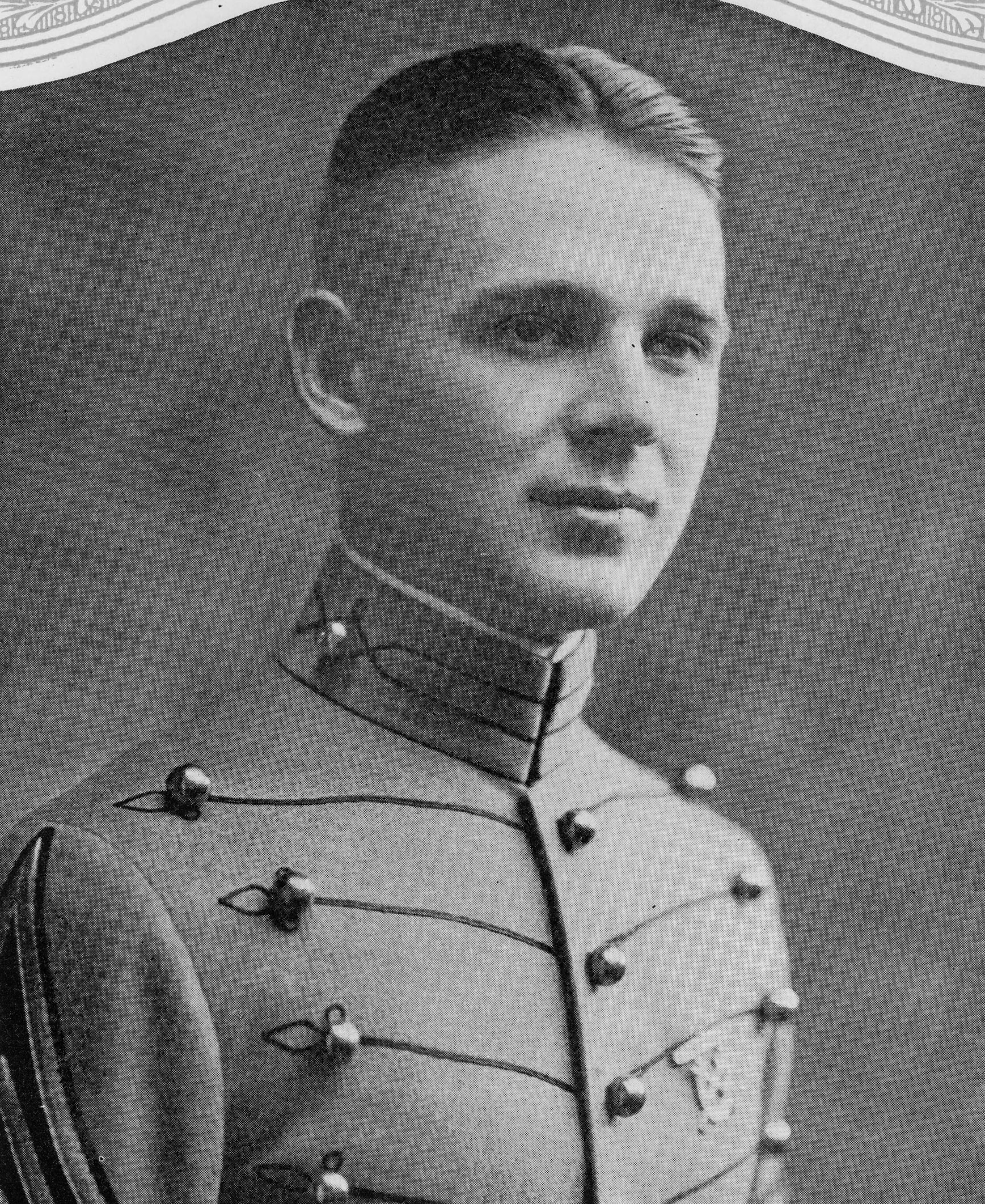
At West Point in 1922

Taylor was born in Keytesville, Missouri, the only child of attorney John Earle Maxwell Taylor and Pearle (Davenport) Taylor. He was raised in Kansas City, graduated from Northeast High School, and attended Kansas City Polytechnic Institute. In 1918, he passed competitive examinations for Congressional appointment by William Patterson Borland to either the United States Military Academy or United States Naval Academy and then passed the Military Academy entrance examination. Taylor attended West Point, graduated fourth in the Class of 1922, and was commissioned as a second lieutenant in the U.S. Army Corps of Engineers. He served in Hawaii with the 3rd Engineers from 1923 to 1926.

Taylor transferred to the Field Artillery and, from 1926 to 1927, served with the 10th Field Artillery, receiving promotion to first lieutenant. Having demonstrated a facility for foreign languages, he studied French in Paris and was then assigned to West Point as an instructor in French and Spanish. He graduated from the Field Artillery School in 1933, and he completed the course at the United States Army Command and General Staff College in 1935.

Taylor was promoted to captain in August 1935 and served at the American embassy in Tokyo from 1935 to 1939, including attaché duty in China in 1937. He graduated from the United States Army War College in 1940 and was promoted to major in July 1940.

== World War II ==
=== Early assignments ===
Taylor served on the War Plans Division staff in 1940 and took part in a defense cooperation mission to Latin American countries. He commanded the 1st Battalion of the 12th Field Artillery Regiment from 1940 to 1941, and then served in the Office of the Secretary of the General Staff until 1942. He received temporary promotions to lieutenant colonel in December 1941, colonel in February 1942, and brigadier general in December 1942.

=== Combat in Sicily and Italy ===
In July 1942, Taylor became chief of staff of the 82nd Infantry Division, a position he held from July until October, by which time the division had been converted into the 82nd Airborne Division. This was followed in November when he was placed in command of the 82nd Airborne Division Artillery and received a promotion to the temporary rank of brigadier general in December. In this role he took part in combat in Sicily and Italy. In the late summer of 1943, during the planning for the Allied invasion of Italy, Taylor's diplomatic and language skills resulted in his secret mission to Rome to co-ordinate an 82nd air drop with Italian forces. General Dwight D. Eisenhower, then the Supreme Allied Commander in the Mediterranean Theater of Operations, later said that "the risks he ran were greater than I asked any other agent or emissary to take during the war."

Hundreds of miles behind the front lines of battle, Taylor was forced by the rules of engagement to wear his American military uniform to prevent himself, if captured, from being shot as a spy. He met with Marshal Pietro Badoglio, who had recently become Italy's prime minister, and General Giacomo Carboni, head of Servizio Informazioni Militare, the Italian military's intelligence agency. The air drop near Rome to capture the city was called off at the last minute since Taylor realized that German forces were already moving in to cover the intended drop zones. His efforts behind enemy lines got Taylor noticed at the highest levels of the Allied command.

=== 101st Airborne Division ===
After the campaigns in the Mediterranean, Taylor was assigned to become the commanding general (CG) of the 101st Airborne Division, nicknamed "The Screaming Eagles", which was then training in England in preparation for the Allied invasion of Normandy, after the division's first commander, Major General William Lee, suffered a heart attack. Taylor received temporary promotion to major general in May 1944.

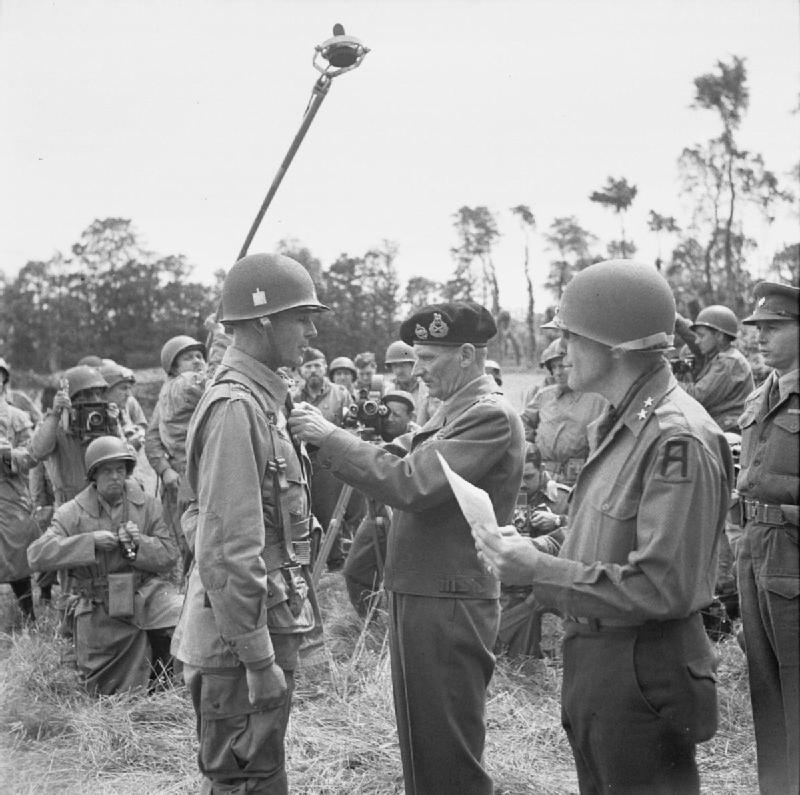
Taylor, pictured here on the left, receiving the Distinguished Service Order from General Sir Bernard Montgomery for gallantry in action at Carentan, France, 12 June 1944

Taylor took part in the division's parachute jump into Normandy on 6 June 1944 (more commonly known simply as D-Day), the first Allied general officer to land in France on D-Day. He subsequently commanded the 101st in the Battle of Normandy, including in the capture of Carentan on 13 June, and the division continued to fight in the campaign as regular infantry. The 101st Airborne Division was pulled out of the line in late June, having been in almost continuous action for nearly a month, and in early July, he returned to England to rest and refit and absorb replacements, after having suffered over 4,600 casualties.

Having been brought up to strength, Taylor led the 101st in Operation Market Garden in the Netherlands in September 1944. He was not present for the division's action during the Siege of Bastogne as part of the Battle of the Bulge since he was attending a staff conference in the United States. The divisional artillery commander, Brigadier General Anthony McAuliffe, exercised command in his absence. Taylor called the defense of Bastogne the 101st Airborne Division's "finest hour" of the war and stated that his absence was one of his greatest disappointments of the war. After Bastogne, Taylor's 101st saw little further service in the war and was sent to the United States in late 1945, where it was deactivated in November.

== Post-World War II ==
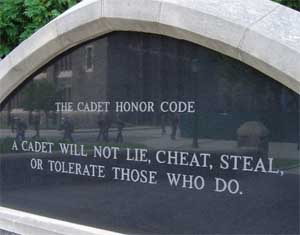
Honor Monument at West Point

On 4 September 1945, Taylor became superintendent of the United States Military Academy. In 1947, he drafted the first official Honor Code publication marking the beginning of the written "Cadet Honor Code" at West Point. He was succeeded by Bryant Moore on 28 January 1949. Afterwards he was the commander of allied troops in West Berlin from 1949 to 1951; when he left that post, he felt like a "Berliner," more than a decade before John F. Kennedy gave his famous "Ich bin ein Berliner" speech in the city. In July 1951 he was promoted to lieutenant general and assigned as the U.S. Army Deputy Chief of Staff for Operations and Administration at the Pentagon.

In June 1953, he was sent to Korea, where he commanded the Eighth United States Army during the final combat operations of the Korean War. In 1955, after a brief assignment in Tokyo as military governor of Allied-occupied Japan, Taylor was appointed the Army's Chief of Staff—becoming the first officer since 1917 to serve as Chief of Staff without seeing service during World War I—succeeding his former mentor, Matthew B. Ridgway. During his tenure, Taylor attempted to guide the service into the age of nuclear weapons by restructuring the infantry division into a Pentomic formation. Observers such as Colonel David Hackworth have written that the effort gutted the role of US Army company and field grade officers, rendering it unable to adapt to the dynamics of combat in Vietnam.

During 1957, President Dwight D. Eisenhower ordered Taylor to deploy 1,000 troops from the 101st Airborne Division to Little Rock, Arkansas to enforce federal court orders to desegregate Central High School during the Little Rock Crisis.

As Army Chief of Staff, Taylor was an outspoken critic of the Eisenhower administration's "New Look" defense policy, which he viewed as dangerously overreliant on nuclear arms and neglectful of conventional forces; Taylor also criticized the inadequacies of the Joint Chiefs of Staff system. Frustrated with the administration's failure to heed his arguments, Taylor retired from active service in July 1959. He campaigned publicly against the "New Look," culminating in the publication in January 1960 of a highly critical book, The Uncertain Trumpet.

== Return to active duty ==
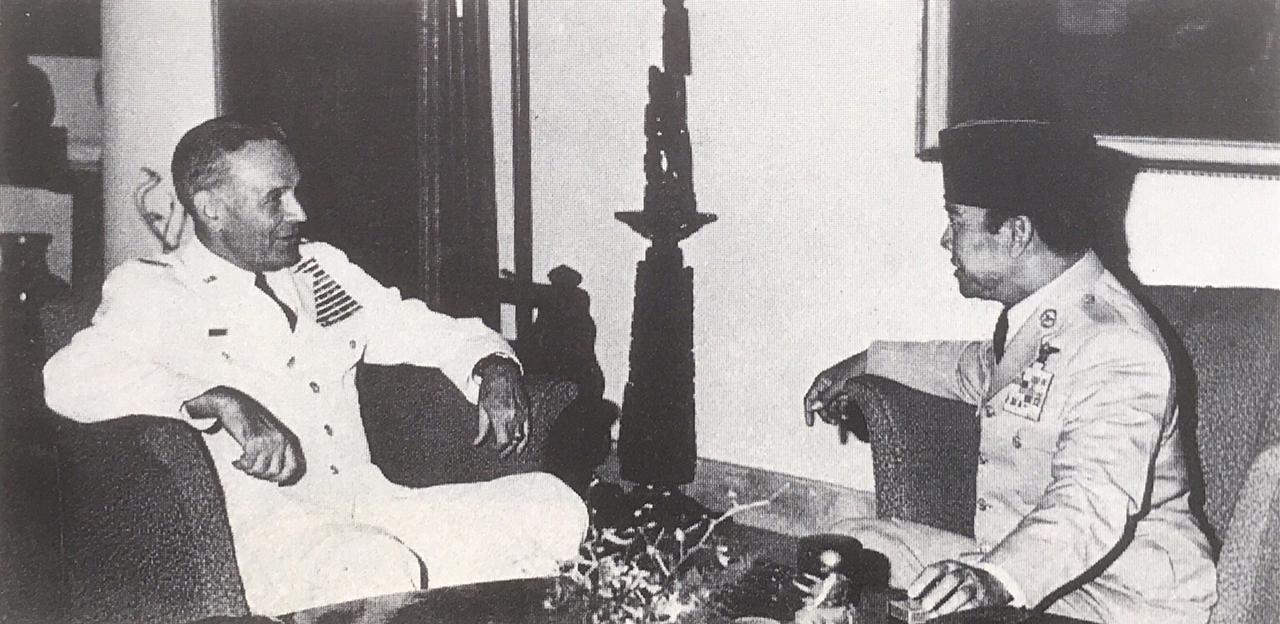
Taylor with Indonesian President Sukarno in Jakarta, Indonesia 1963

As the 1960 presidential campaign unfolded, Democratic nominee John F. Kennedy criticized Eisenhower's defense policy and championed a muscular "flexible response" policy intentionally aligned with Taylor's views as described in The Uncertain Trumpet. After the April 1961 failure of the Bay of Pigs Invasion, Kennedy, who felt the Joint Chiefs of Staff had failed to provide him with satisfactory military advice, appointed Taylor to head a task force to investigate the failure of the invasion.

Both President Kennedy and his brother, Attorney General Robert F. Kennedy, had immense regard for Taylor, whom they saw as a man of unquestionable integrity, sincerity, intelligence, and diplomacy. The Cuba Study Group met for six weeks from April to May 1961 to perform an "autopsy" on the disastrous events surrounding the Bay of Pigs Invasion. In the course of their work together, Taylor developed a deep regard and a personal affection for Robert F. Kennedy, a friendship that was wholly mutual and which remained firm until RFK's assassination in 1968.

Taylor spoke of Robert Kennedy glowingly: "He is always on the lookout for a 'snow job,' impatient with evasion and imprecision, and relentless in his determination to get at the truth." In January, 1965 Robert Kennedy named his next-to-last son Matthew Maxwell Taylor Kennedy (better known as an adult as "Max").

Shortly after the investigation concluded, the Kennedys' warm feelings for Taylor and the President's lack of confidence in the Joint Chiefs of Staff led John Kennedy to recall Taylor to active duty and install him in the newly created post of military representative to the president. His close personal relationship with the President and White House access effectively made Taylor the President's primary military adviser, cutting out the Joint Chiefs. On 1 October 1962, Kennedy ended this uncomfortable arrangement by appointing Taylor as Chairman of the Joint Chiefs of Staff, a position in which he served until 1964.

== Vietnam War ==
Taylor was of crucial importance during the first few years of the Vietnam War, during his time as the Chairman of the Joint Chiefs of Staff, and later being appointed Ambassador to the Republic of Vietnam. Whereas Kennedy told Taylor in October 1961 that "the independence of South Vietnam rests with the people and government of that country", Taylor soon recommended that 8,000 American combat troops be sent to the region at once. After making his report to the Cabinet and the Chiefs of Staff (with Deputy National Security Adviser Walt Rostow), Taylor reflected on the decision to send troops to South Vietnam: "I don't recall anyone who was strongly against, except one man, and that was the President. The President just didn't want to be convinced that this was the right thing to do.... It was really the President's personal conviction that U.S. ground troops shouldn't go in."

In May 1963, mass protests and civil disobedience broke out in South Vietnam in response to President Ngo Dinh Diem's persecution of the Buddhist majority, which was met with military crackdowns, culminating in nationwide raids on Buddhist temples. In the wake of the raids, the US sent out Cable 243, which called for Ambassador Henry Cabot Lodge Jr. to lobby for the removal from influence of Diem's younger brother and chief political adviser Ngo Dinh Nhu, and to look for alternative leadership options if Diem refused. As it was known that Diem would never sideline Nhu, it was effectively an authorisation for Lodge to encourage a military coup. The cable was prepared and sent out over a weekend when many leading Washington figures were away, under the misunderstanding that higher authorisation had been given. Marine General Victor Krulak signed off on behalf of the military without showing Taylor, who was a supporter of Diem. On Monday, 26 August, at the White House, Kennedy was met with angry comments by Secretary of State Dean Rusk, Secretary of Defense Robert S. McNamara, CIA Director John McCone and Taylor, all of whom denied authorizing the cable. Kennedy was reported to have said "My God! My government's coming apart." Taylor felt insulted by the final line of the cable which asserted that only the "minimum essential people" had seen its contents. During the acrimonious exchange, he condemned the cable as an "egregious end run" by an anti-Diem faction. Roger Hilsman rebutted Taylor by asserting that Kennedy and representatives of departments and agencies had approved the message. Years afterward, Taylor declared "The anti-Diem group centered in State [department] had taken advantage of the absence of the principal officials to get out instructions which would never have been approved as written under normal circumstances". Taylor claimed that the message was reflective of Forrestal and Hilsman's "well-known compulsion" to remove Diem. He accused them of pulling "a fast one". Kennedy asked his advisers if they wanted to retract the cable, but they agreed to stand by the original decision to maintain consistency. Taylor said that "You can't change American policy in twenty-four hours and expect anyone to ever believe you again." Taylor also objected to two phone calls on 24 August to Washington from Admiral Harry D. Felt, the commander of US forces in the Pacific, calling for backing to the generals to remove Nhu. Felt said that the mid-level officers would not fight if Nhu was not removed. Taylor became angry that Felt had advised the State Department to move against Diem without first consulting the Joint Chiefs of Staff. Taylor then told Kennedy that Americans would not tolerate their officers selecting the president, and thus they should not usurp the cabinet in doing the same in South Vietnam.

Taylor remained opposed to any moves towards the disposal of Diem. Years afterward, he said that Diem was "a terrible pain in the neck", but was a devoted servant of his country. Taylor called on Kennedy to support Diem until a better leader had been lined up, pointing out that the officers were divided and therefore could not be relied on to plot and stage a coup.

The junta led by General Duong Van Minh following Diem's removal lasted three months until General Nguyen Khanh toppled Minh in January 1964. Taylor and other military officials had disagreed with Minh's reluctance to carry out large-scale offensives against the communists and wanted a more aggressive approach. He was known to regard Khanh as the more competent ARVN general. However, Taylor changed his opinion upon being made Ambassador to South Vietnam in July 1964 when Lodge returned to the US.

In August, following widespread Buddhist protests, some senior officers, particularly the Catholic Generals Tran Thien Khiem and Nguyễn Văn Thiệu, decried Khanh's concessions to the Buddhists. They plotted Khánh's removal and sought out Taylor for a private endorsement, but Taylor did not want any more leadership changes, fearing a corrosive effect on the already-unstable government. This deterred Khiêm's group from acting on their plans.

On 13 September, another coup attempt led by Catholic Generals Duong Van Duc and Lam Van Phat started while Taylor was on a flight from the US—back to Saigon and catching him off-guard. The coup failed, and Taylor helped organize for Khiêm to be made Saigon's representative in Washington. During the coup, Minh had remained silent, angering Khánh and keeping their long-running rivalry going. By the end of October, the Johnson administration had become more supportive of Taylor's negative opinion of Minh and eventually paid for Minh to go on a "good will tour" to remove him from the political scene.

Taylor frequently clashed with General Nguyen Khanh and helped to engineer his removal, having supported Khanh's deposal of General Duong Van Minh.

== Criticisms ==
Taylor received fierce criticism in Major (later Lieutenant General and National Security Advisor) H.R. McMaster's book Dereliction of Duty: Lyndon Johnson, Robert McNamara, the Joint Chiefs of Staff, and the Lies That Led to Vietnam. Specifically, Taylor was accused of intentionally misrepresenting the views of the Joint Chiefs to Defense Secretary Robert McNamara and of cutting the Joint Chiefs out of the decision-making process.

Whereas the Chiefs felt that it was their duty to offer unbiased assessments and recommendations on military matters, Taylor was of the firm belief that the chairman should not only support the president's decisions but also be a true believer in them. That discrepancy manifested itself during the early planning phases of the war while it was still being decided what the nature of American involvement should be. McNamara and the civilians of the office of the secretary of defense were firmly behind the idea of graduated pressure: to escalate pressure slowly against North Vietnam in order to demonstrate U.S. resolve. The Joint Chiefs, however, strenuously disagreed with that and believed that if the US got involved further in Vietnam, it should be with the clear intention of winning and through the use of overwhelming force. McMaster contends that using a variety of political maneuvering, including liberal use of outright deception, Taylor succeeded in keeping the Joint Chiefs' opinions away from the President and helped set the stage for McNamara to begin to dominate systematically the U.S. decision-making process on Vietnam.

Taylor was also criticized by Tom Ricks in his book The Generals (2012): "Maxwell Taylor arguably was the most destructive general in American history. As Army chief of staff in the 1950s, he steered the US military toward engaging in 'brushfire wars.' As White House military adviser during the early 1960s, he encouraged President John F. Kennedy to deepen American involvement in Vietnam. As chairman of the Joint Chiefs, he poisoned relations between the military and civilian leadership. He was also key in picking Gen. William Westmoreland to command the war there."

== Second retirement ==
Taylor again retired from the Army on 1 July 1964, having been succeeded as Chairman of the Joint Chief of Staff by General Earle Wheeler, and became Ambassador to South Vietnam from 1964 to 1965, succeeding Henry Cabot Lodge Jr. Taylor served in the Pentagon during parts of 1965 as "SACSA", the Special Advisor for Counterinsurgency Affairs". He was Special Consultant to the President and Chairman of the Foreign Intelligence Advisory Board (1965–1969) and President of the Institute for Defense Analyses (1966–1969).

Afflicted with amyotrophic lateral sclerosis (also called "Lou Gehrig's disease"), Taylor spent his last three months at Walter Reed Army Medical Center in Washington, DC, and died at 85 years of age on April 19, 1987. He was interred at Arlington National Cemetery.

== Personal life ==
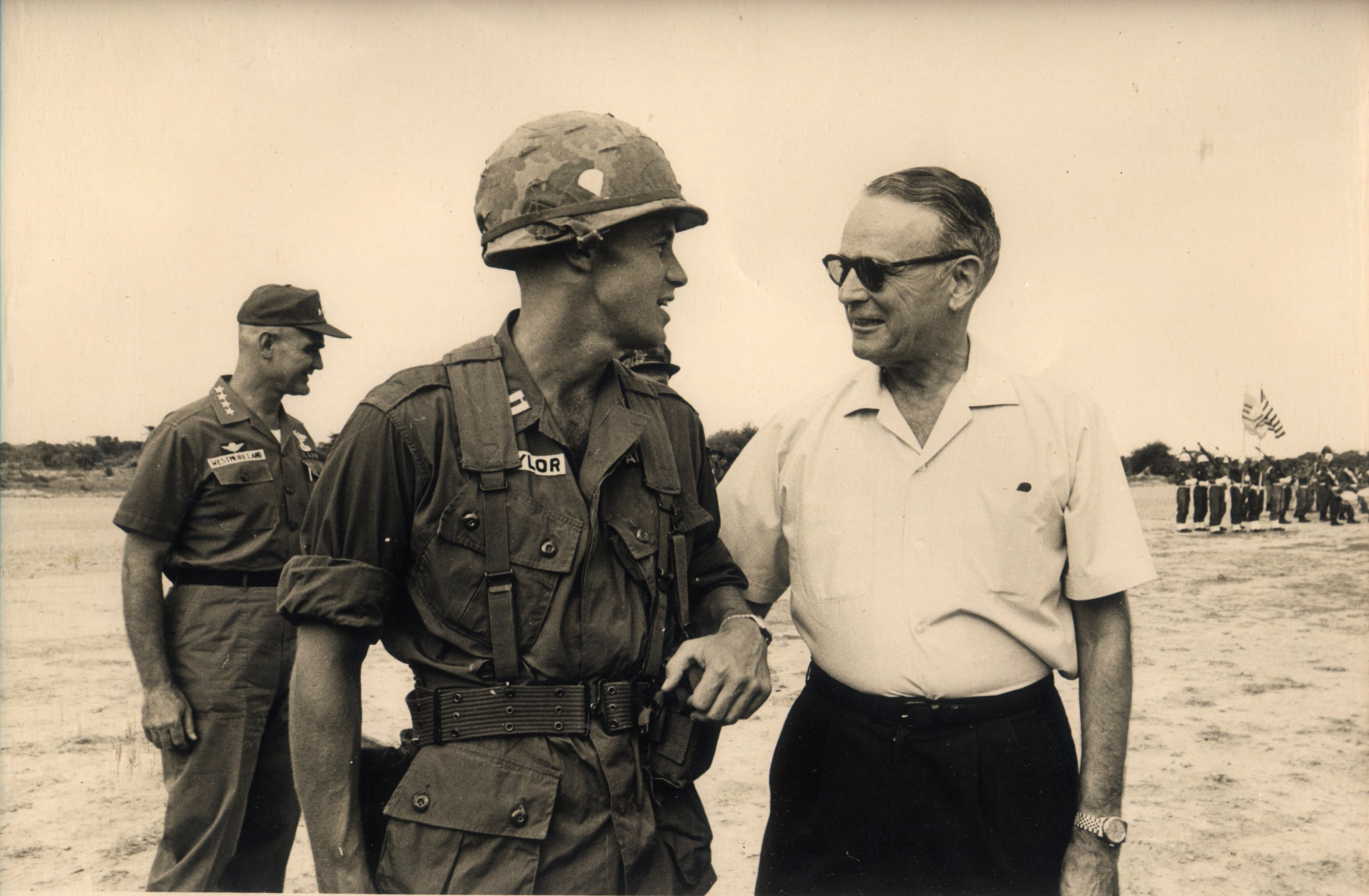
This shot was taken on the day that Captain Thomas Happer Taylor arrived in Vietnam to begin his service there and met his father General Taylor on the same day the latter left Vietnam. General William Westmoreland is in the background

In 1925, Taylor married the former Lydia Gardner Happer (1901–1997). They had two sons: John Maxwell Taylor (b. 1930) and Thomas Happer Taylor (1934-2017), the latter being a West Point graduate (Class of 1960) and Army officer.

== Dramatic portrayals ==
- Taylor was portrayed by Paul Maxwell in A Bridge Too Far, Andrew Duggan in The Missiles of October and Bill Smitrovich in Thirteen Days. He was portrayed by Noble Willingham in the war comedy/drama Good Morning, Vietnam. He was portrayed by David Andrews in Band of Brothers.

== Major assignments ==
- Commander, 101st Airborne Division – March 1944 to August 1945
- Superintendent, United States Military Academy – 4 September 1945 to 28 January 1949
- Commander, US Forces in West Berlin – February 1949 to June 1951
- Deputy Chief of Staff for Operations and Administration – July 1951 to February 1953
- Commander, Eighth United States Army – 11 February 1953 to 25 March 1955
- Commander, United Nations Command – 1 April 1955 to 5 June 1955
- Chief of Staff, United States Army – 30 June 1955 to 30 June 1959
- Chairman of the Joint Chiefs of Staff – 1 October 1962 to 1 July 1964

== Awards ==

=== United States decorations and medals ===
- Basic Parachutist Badge with two bronze jump stars
- Distinguished Service Cross
- Distinguished Service Medal (U.S. Army) with three oak leaf clusters
- Silver Star with one oak leaf cluster
- Legion of Merit
- Bronze Star Medal
- Purple Heart
- Presidential Unit Citation with oak leaf cluster
- World War I Victory Medal (United States)
- American Defense Service Medal with "Foreign Service" clasp
- American Campaign Medal
- European-African-Middle Eastern Campaign Medal with arrowhead and six campaign stars
- World War II Victory Medal
- Army of Occupation Medal
- National Defense Service Medal with bronze star
- Korean Service Medal with two campaign stars

=== Foreign orders, decorations and medals ===
- Chief Commander, Philippine Legion of Honor, Philippines
- Grand Cordon, Order of the Cloud and Banner, China
- Grand Cordon, Order of the Holy Trinity, Ethiopia
- Grand Officer, Order of Leopold, Belgium
- Grand Officer with palm, Order of the Crown, Belgium
- Grand Officer, Order of Boyaca, Colombia
- Companion, Order of the Bath, United Kingdom
- Knight Commander, Order of the British Empire, United Kingdom
- Commander, Legion of Honor, France
- Knight, Legion of Honor, France
- Commander, Order of George I, Greece
- Companion, Distinguished Service Order, United Kingdom
- Croix de Guerre with palm, France
- Order of National Security Merit, 2nd class with two stars
- Order of Merit of the Italian Republic, Commander
- Brazilian Order of Military Merit, Commander
- United Nations Korea Medal

(General Taylor also received a number of other foreign honors.)

== Dates of rank ==
No insignia	Cadet, United States Military Academy: 6 November 1918
	Second Lieutenant, Regular Army: 13 June 1922
	First Lieutenant, Regular Army: 13 February 1927
	Captain, Regular Army: 1 August 1935
	Major, Regular Army: 1 July 1940
	Lieutenant Colonel, Army of the United States: 24 December 1941
	Colonel, Army of the United States: 1 February 1942
	Brigadier General, Army of the United States: 4 December 1942
	Major General, Army of the United States: 31 May 1944
	Lieutenant Colonel, Regular Army: 13 June 1945
	Brigadier General, Regular Army: 24 January 1948 (Later changed to 27 June 1944)
	Major General, Regular Army: 29 July 1951
	Lieutenant General, Army of the United States: 3 August 1951
	General, Army of the United States: 23 June 1953
	General, Regular Army, Retired List: 1 July 1959
	General, Retired on active duty: 1 October 1962
	General, Regular Army, Retired List: 1 July 1964

== See also ==
- The Best and the Brightest

== References and further reading ==
- For Bay of Pigs and Vietnam War material – "Robert F. Kennedy and His Times", Arthur M. Schlesinger Jr.
- "The Chairmanship of the Joint Chiefs of Staff." Ronald H. Cole, Lorna S. Jaffe, Walter S. Poole, Willard J. Webb. Joint History Office, Office of the Chairman of the Joint Chiefs of Staff, 1995. Section II, pp. 77–84.
- Blair, Anne E. (1995). Lodge in Vietnam: A Patriot Abroad. New Haven, Connecticut: Yale University Press. ISBN 0-300-06226-5.
- Halberstam, David; Singal, Daniel J. (2008). The Making of a Quagmire: America and Vietnam during the Kennedy Era. Lanham, Maryland: Rowman & Littlefield. ISBN 978-0-7425-6007-9.
- Jacobs, Seth (2006). Cold War Mandarin: Ngo Dinh Diem and the Origins of America's War in Vietnam, 1950–1963. Lanham, Maryland: Rowman & Littlefield. ISBN 0-7425-4447-8.
- Jones, Howard (2003). Death of a Generation: how the assassinations of Diem and JFK prolonged the Vietnam War. New York City: Oxford University Press. ISBN 0-19-505286-2.
- Kahin, George McT. (1986). Intervention: How America Became Involved in Vietnam. New York City: Knopf. ISBN 978-0-394-54367-3.
- Karnow, Stanley (1997). Vietnam: A history. New York City: Penguin Books. ISBN 0-670-84218-4.
- Kinnard, Douglas. "The Soldier as Ambassador: Maxwell Taylor in Saigon, 1964-65." Parameters 21.1 (1991): 31–46. doi:10.55540/0031-1723.1600.
- Moyar, Mark (2006). Triumph Forsaken: The Vietnam War, 1954–1965. New York City: Cambridge University Press. ISBN 978-0-521-86911-9.
- Shaplen, Robert (1966). The Lost Revolution: Vietnam 1945–1965. London: André Deutsch. OCLC 460367485.
- Yockelson, Mitchell (2020). The Paratrooper Generals: Matthew Ridgway, Maxwell Taylor, and the American Airborne from D-Day through Normandy. Rowman & Littlefield. ISBN 9780811768511.
- Taylor, John M. (2001). An American Soldier: The Wars of General Maxwell Taylor. Presidio Press. ISBN 978-0891417521.

=== Primary sources ===
- The Pentagon Papers: The Defense Department History of United States Decisionmaking on Vietnam. Boston: Beacon Press. 5 vols. "Senator Gravel Edition"; includes documents not included in government version. ISBN 0-8070-0526-6 & ISBN 0-8070-0522-3. See Pentagon Papers
- Taylor, Maxwell D. Swords and Plowshares (W.W. Norton, 1972).

Military offices
Preceded by William Lee	Commanding General 101st Airborne Division; 1944–1945	Post deactivated
Preceded by Francis Wilby	Superintendent of the United States Military Academy; 1945–1949	Succeeded by Bryant Moore
Preceded by James Van Fleet	Commanding General Eighth Army; 1953–1955	Succeeded by Lyman Lemnitzer
Preceded by Matthew Ridgway	Chief of Staff of the United States Army; 1955–1959	Succeeded by Lyman Lemnitzer
Preceded by Lyman Lemnitzer	Chair of the Joint Chiefs of Staff; 1962–1964	Succeeded by Earle Wheeler
Political offices
Preceded by John Hull	Governor of the Ryukyu Islands; 1955	Succeeded by Lyman Lemnitzer
Diplomatic posts
Preceded by Henry Cabot Lodge	United States Ambassador to South Vietnam; 1964–1965	Succeeded by Henry Cabot Lodge
Government offices
Preceded by Clark Clifford	Chair of the President's Intelligence Advisory Board; 1968–1969	Succeeded by George Anderson
