= Earle Wheeler =

US Army general (1908–1975)

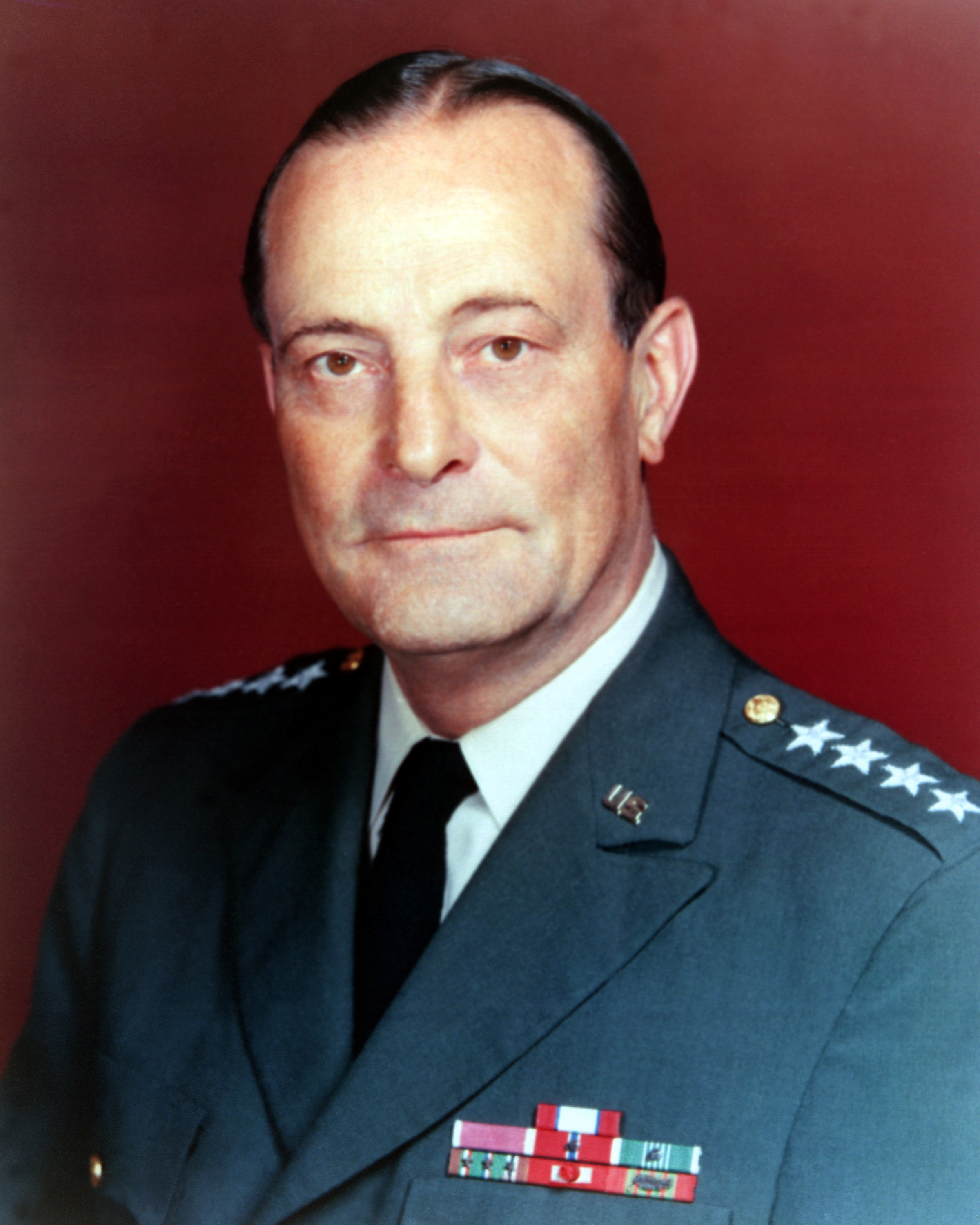
- Official portrait, 1964
- Born: 13 January 1908; Washington, D.C., US
- Died: 18 December 1975 (aged 67); Frederick County, Maryland, US
- Burial place: Arlington National Cemetery
- Military career
- Allegiance: United States
- Branch: United States Army
- Service years: 1924–1970
- Rank: General
- Nickname: Bus
- Commands: Chairman of the Joint Chiefs of Staff; Chief of Staff of the United States Army; III Corps; 2nd Armored Division; 351st Infantry Regiment; 2nd Battalion, 141st Infantry Regiment
- Conflicts: World War II; Vietnam War
- Awards: Defense Distinguished Service Medal; Army Distinguished Service Medal (2); Air Force Distinguished Service Medal; Legion of Merit; Bronze Star Medal (2)

Earle Gilmore Wheeler (13 January 1908 – 18 December 1975), nicknamed Bus, was a United States Army general who served as the chief of Staff of the United States Army from 1962 to 1964 and then as the sixth chairman of the Joint Chiefs of Staff (1964–1970), holding the latter position during the Vietnam War.

== Early life and education ==
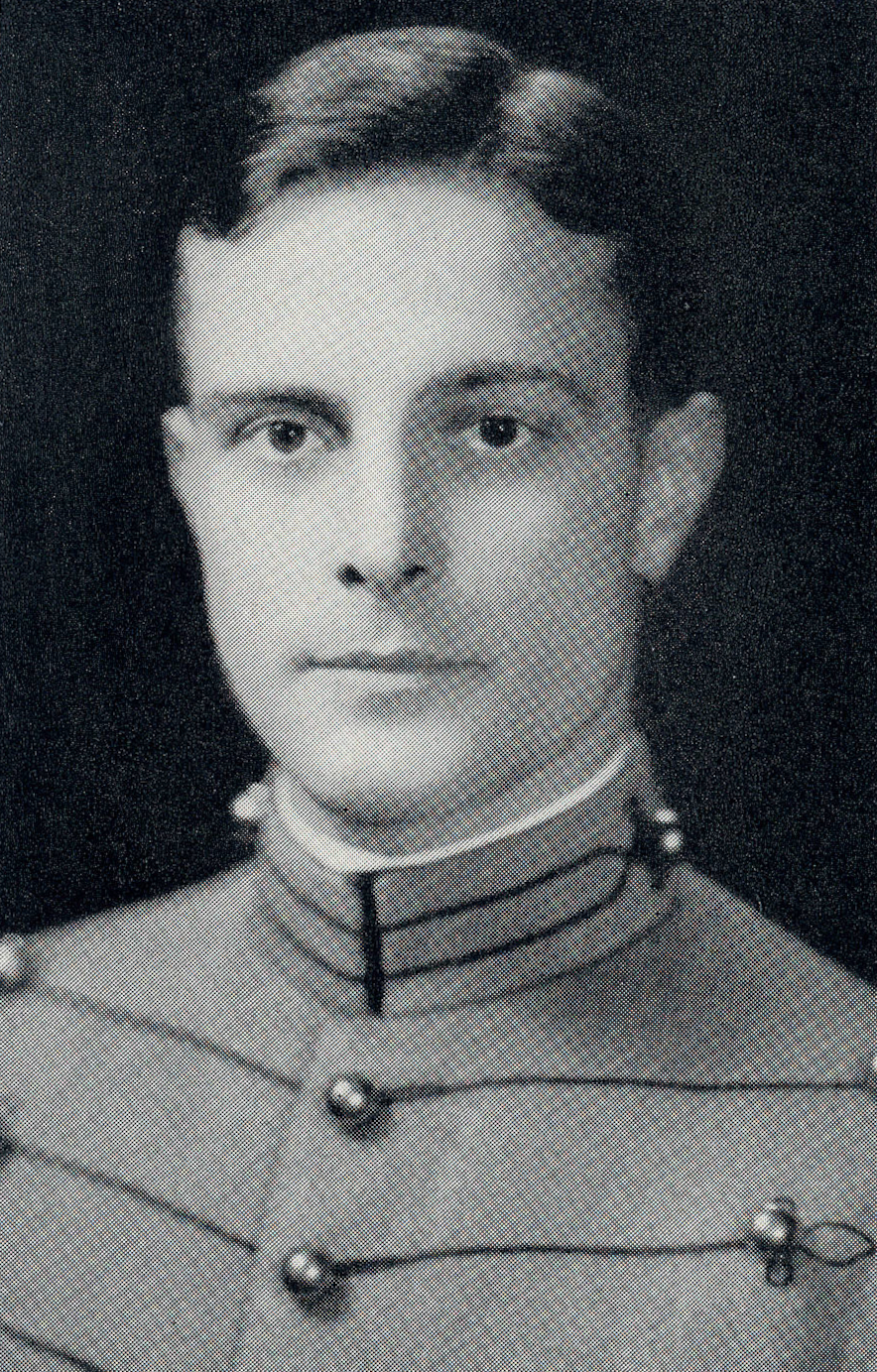
Wheeler as a West Point cadet in 1932

Earle Gilmore Wheeler was born in Washington, D.C., on 13 January 1908, to Dock Stone and Ida Gilmore. He was later adopted by Ida's second husband. Wheeler began his military career in 1924, at the age of 16, as a private in Company E, 121st Engineers, District of Columbia National Guard. He was promoted to sergeant in 1926, then, in 1928, was honorably discharged in order to enroll at the United States Military Academy. He graduated from the academy in 1932 and was commissioned into the infantry. After graduation he married Frances "Betty" Rogers Howell, whom he had met at a society party in 1930. He served in the 29th Infantry Regiment from 1932 to 1936, then attended Infantry School in 1937. He served with the 15th Infantry Regiment, from 1937 to 1940, stationed in China from 1937 to 1938.

== Career ==
From 1940 to 1941, Wheeler was a mathematics instructor at West Point. Rising from battalion commander to more senior roles, he trained the newly activated 36th and 99th Infantry Divisions from 1941 to 1944, then went to Europe in November 1944 as chief of staff of the newly formed 63rd Infantry Division.

Wheeler served in senior staff positions in a variety of specialties, including supply, intelligence, planning, and armor.

In late 1945, Wheeler returned to the U.S. as an artillery instructor at Fort Sill, then returned to Germany from 1947 to 1949 as a staff officer of the United States Constabulary (formerly VI Corps), occupying Germany. He attended the National War College in 1950. He then returned to Europe as a staff officer in NATO, in a series of roles. In 1951–52 he commanded the 351st Infantry Regiment, which controlled the Free Territory of Trieste, a front-line position of the Cold War.

In 1955, Wheeler joined the General Staff at The Pentagon. In 1958 he took command of the 2nd Armored Division. In 1959, he took command of III Corps. He became Director of the Joint Staff in 1960. In 1962 he was briefly Deputy Commander of U.S. Forces in Europe before being named Chief of Staff of the United States Army later that year.

=== Chairman of the Joint Chiefs of Staff ===
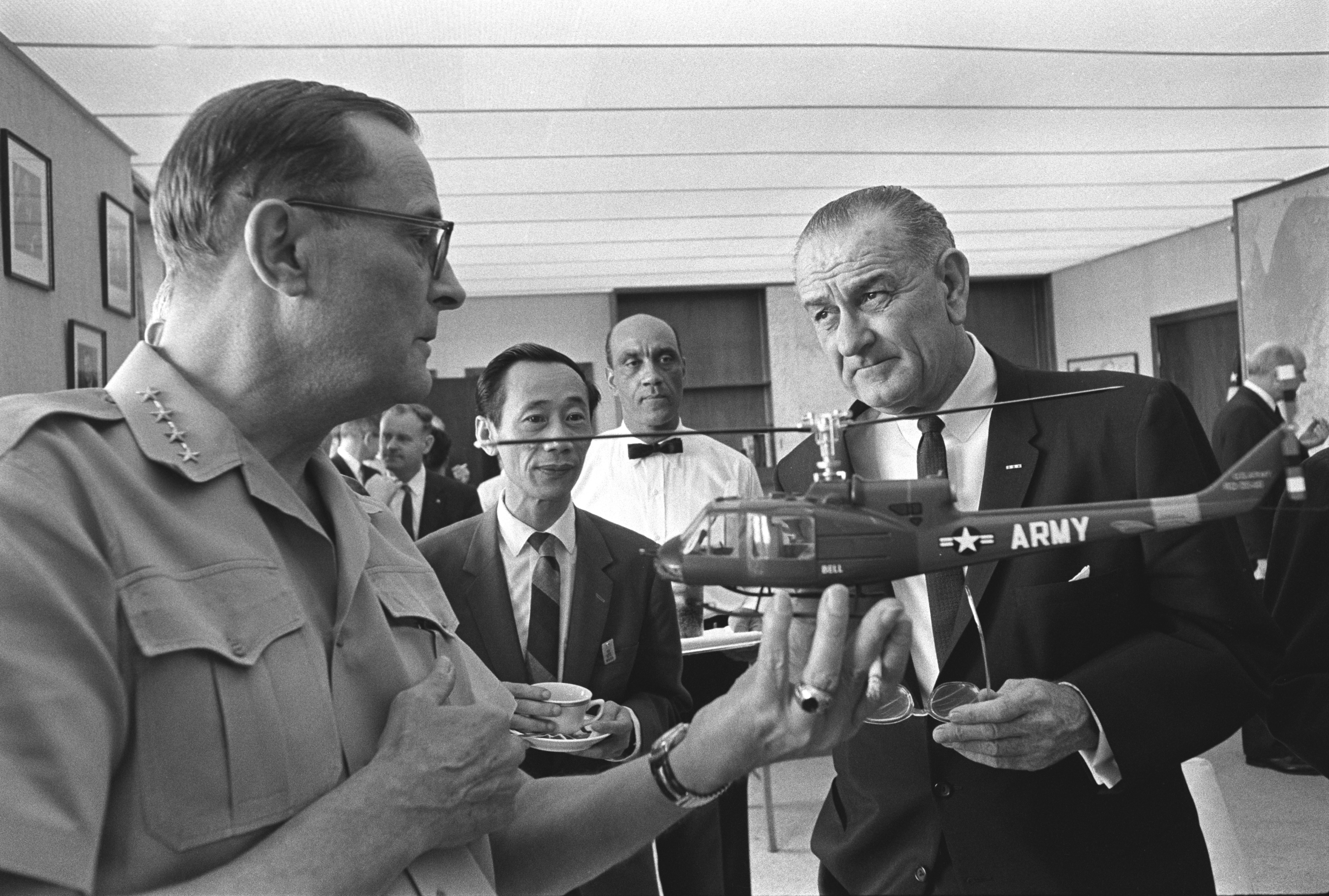
Earle Wheeler (holding model of helicopter) with Lyndon B. Johnson at the Honolulu Conference in 1966

President Lyndon B. Johnson appointed Wheeler Chairman of the Joint Chiefs of Staff in July 1964 to succeed General Maxwell Taylor. Wheeler's tenure as the nation's top military officer spanned the height of America's involvement in the Vietnam War.

Wheeler's accession to the top job in the U.S. military, over the heads of officers with more combat experience, drew some criticism. Then Air Force Chief of Staff, General Curtis LeMay, called him "Polly Parrot" and said he was awarded a medal for "fighting the Battle of Fort Benning", an army post in Georgia where Wheeler served during much of World War II.

Wheeler oversaw and supported the expanding U.S. military role in the Vietnam War in the mid-1960s, consistently backing the field commander's requests for additional troops and operating authority. He often urged Johnson to strike harder at North Vietnam and to expand aerial bombing campaigns. Wheeler was concerned with minimizing costs to U.S. ground troops. At the same time, he preferred what he saw as a realistic assessment of the capabilities of the South Vietnamese military. This earned him a reputation as a "hawk."

Wheeler, with General William Westmoreland, the field commander, and Johnson, pushed to raise additional American forces after the February 1968 Tet Offensive. American media at the time widely reported the Tet Offensive as Viet Cong victory. This followed a widely noted news report in 1967 that cited an unnamed American general (later identified as General Frederick C. Weyand) who called the situation in Vietnam a "stalemate." It was a view with which Wheeler agreed in more confidential circles. However, Wheeler was concerned that the American buildup in Vietnam depleted U.S. military capabilities in other parts of the world. He called for 205,000 additional ground troops, to be gained by mobilizing reserves, but intended these remain in the US as an active reserve. The president decided this was not easily accomplished. Together with the Tet Offensive and shifts in American public opinion, this abortive effort contributed to Johnson's ultimate decision to de-escalate the war.

After the election of President Richard M. Nixon, Wheeler oversaw the implementation of the "Vietnamization" program, whereby South Vietnamese forces assumed increasing responsibility for the war as American forces were withdrawn.

Wheeler retired from the U.S. Army in July 1970. Wheeler was the longest-serving chairman of the Joint Chiefs to date, serving six years. Upon his retirement, he was awarded the Defense Distinguished Service Medal and was the first recipient of that decoration.

== Death ==
Wheeler died in Frederick, Maryland, after a heart attack on 18 December 1975. Leaving his wife Frances Rogers Howell and his son, Gilmore Stone Wheeler.

== Dates of rank ==
Insignia	Rank	Temporary		Permanent	
Insignia	Rank	Component	Date	Component	Date
	Private			District of Columbia National Guard	1924
	Sergeant			District of Columbia National Guard	1926
No insignia	Cadet			United States Military Academy	1928
	Second lieutenant			Regular Army	10 Jun 1932
	First lieutenant			Regular Army	1 Aug 1935
	Captain	Army of the United States	9 Sep 1940	Regular Army	10 Jun 1942
	Major	Army of the United States	1 Feb 1942		
	Lieutenant colonel	Army of the United States	11 Nov 1942		
	Colonel	Army of the United States	26 Jun 1943		
	Lieutenant colonel	Army of the United States	1 Jul 1947*	Regular Army	1 Jul 1948
	Colonel	Army of the United States	7 Sep 1950	Regular Army	6 Oct 1953
	Brigadier general	Army of the United States	8 Nov 1952	Regular Army	13 May 1960
	Major general	Army of the United States	21 Dec 1955	Regular Army	30 Jun 1961
	Lieutenant general	Army of the United States	21 Apr 1960		
	General	Army of the United States	1 Mar 1962	Regular Army, Retired List	7 Jul 1970

* postwar reduction

== Decorations and medals ==

1st Row	Defense Distinguished Service Medal		Army Distinguished Service Medal with Oak Leaf Cluster	
2nd Row	Air Force Distinguished Service Medal	Legion of Merit	Bronze Star Medal with Oak Leaf Cluster	Army Commendation Medal with Oak Leaf Cluster
3rd Row	American Defense Service Medal	American Campaign Medal	European-African-Middle Eastern Campaign Medal with three campaign stars	World War II Victory Medal
4th Row	Army of Occupation Medal with "Germany" clasp	National Defense Service Medal with Oak Leaf Cluster	Commander of the Legion of Honour (France)	Croix de Guerre with Palm (France)

Military offices
Preceded by George H. Decker	Chief of Staff of the United States Army; 1 October 1962 – 2 July 1964	Succeeded by Harold K. Johnson
Preceded by Maxwell Taylor	Chairman of the Joint Chiefs of Staff; 3 July 1964 – 2 July 1970	Succeeded by Thomas Moorer
