= Sigma war games =

War games played in the Pentagon in the 1960s

The Sigma war games were a series of classified high level war games played in the Pentagon during the 1960s to strategize the conduct of the burgeoning Vietnam War. The games were designed to replicate then-current conditions in Indochina, with an aim toward predicting future events in the region. In almost all runs, the outcome was either a communist win, or a stalemate that led to protests in the US.

== Game setup ==
The games were staffed with high-ranking officials standing in to represent both domestic and foreign characters; stand-ins were chosen for their expertise concerning those they were called upon to represent. The games were supervised by a Control appointed to oversee both sides. The opposing Blue and Red Teams customary in war games were designated the friendly and enemy forces as was usual; however, several smaller teams were sometimes subsumed under Red and Blue Teams. Over the course of the games, the Red Team at times contained the Yellow Team for the People's Republic of China, the Brown Team for the Democratic Republic of Vietnam, the Black Team for the Viet Cong, and the Green for the USSR.

Preparation for these simulations was quite extensive. A game staff of as many as 45 people researched and developed the scenarios. The actual play of the war game involved 30 to 35 participants. There were four or five simulations per year, solicited secretively from the State Department, the Central Intelligence Agency, and major military commands. As with other war planning activities, the games were conducted in a classified environment and the details and results of the games were not publicized outside U.S. national security policy circles.

== Sigma I-62 ==
In February 1962, some members of the Joint Chiefs of Staff of the John F. Kennedy administration war gamed the unfolding situation in Southeast Asia. The war game director noted, "it appears that Red wanted to win without a war while Blue wanted not to lose, also without a war." The conclusion drawn from Sigma I-62 was that American intervention would be unsuccessful. This was the first of the Sigma war games.

== Sigma I-63 ==
Sigma I-63 was played in spring 1963. It was held with senior level officials setting policy for the Red and Blue Teams. Working level officials were the actual players.

Ambassador William H. Sullivan was a participant. His recollection is that Sigma I-63 ended in a fictional 1970 with 500,000 American troops locked in a stalemate in Vietnam, and conscription riots in the United States.

== Sigma I-64 ==
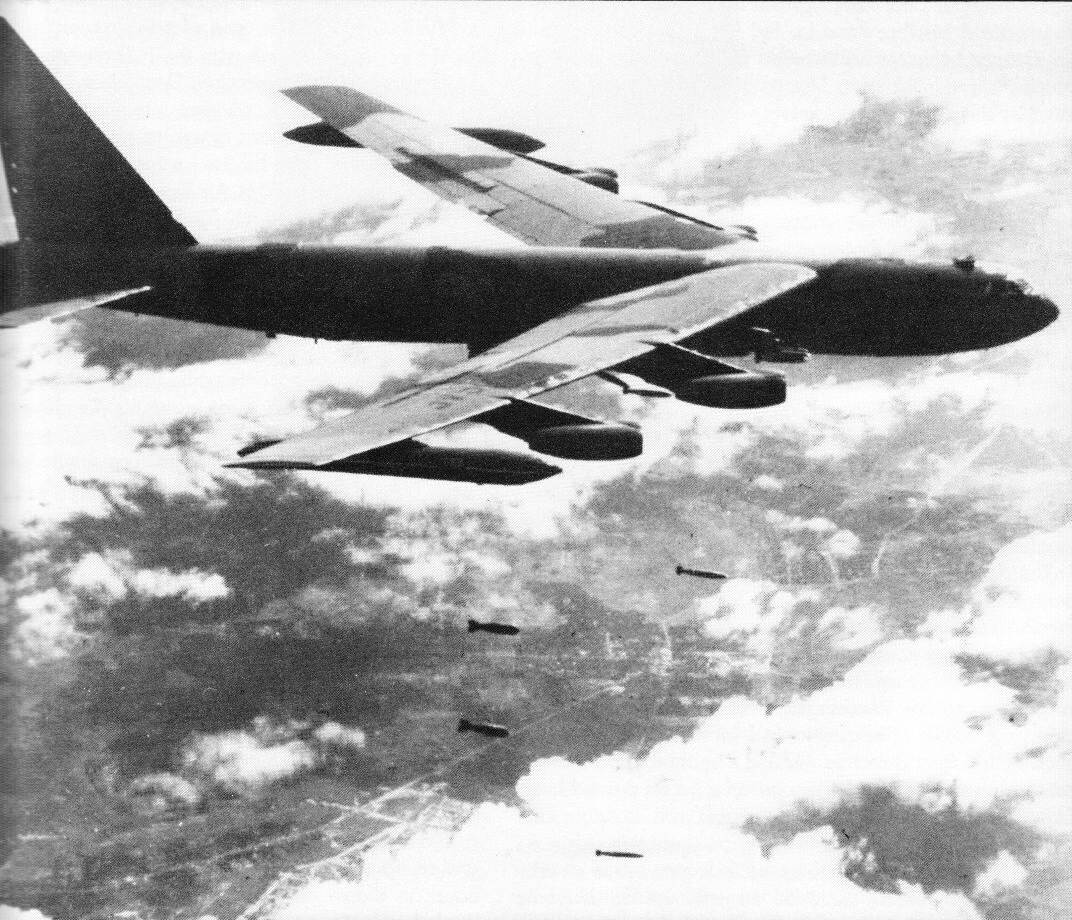
B-52 bombing North Vietnam. Sigma suggested that air power would have little effect on North Vietnam's ability to wage war.

Sigma I-64 was played between 6 and 9 April 1964. It was designed to test scenarios of escalation of warfare in Vietnam, including a gradually increasing bombing campaign. The concept of a massive Chinese intervention as in the Korean War was a major consideration to be explored.

A summary of the war game results noted that intervention in Vietnam would "lay a basis" for similar actions against Cuba. Because the Viet Cong's insurgency was within the internationally acceptable limits of covert warfare, an open war waged against them would become an actual war. As a response, the Soviet Union and the People's Republic of China could be expected to change their methods of Cold War opposition to the United States. Adverse public opinion both domestic and foreign would plague the U.S. as a result.

One conclusion to be drawn was that air power would have little effect on North Vietnam's ability to wage war. Despite a commitment of a projected 500,000 American troops to fighting in Vietnam, the communists were deemed to have won.

== Sigma II-64 ==
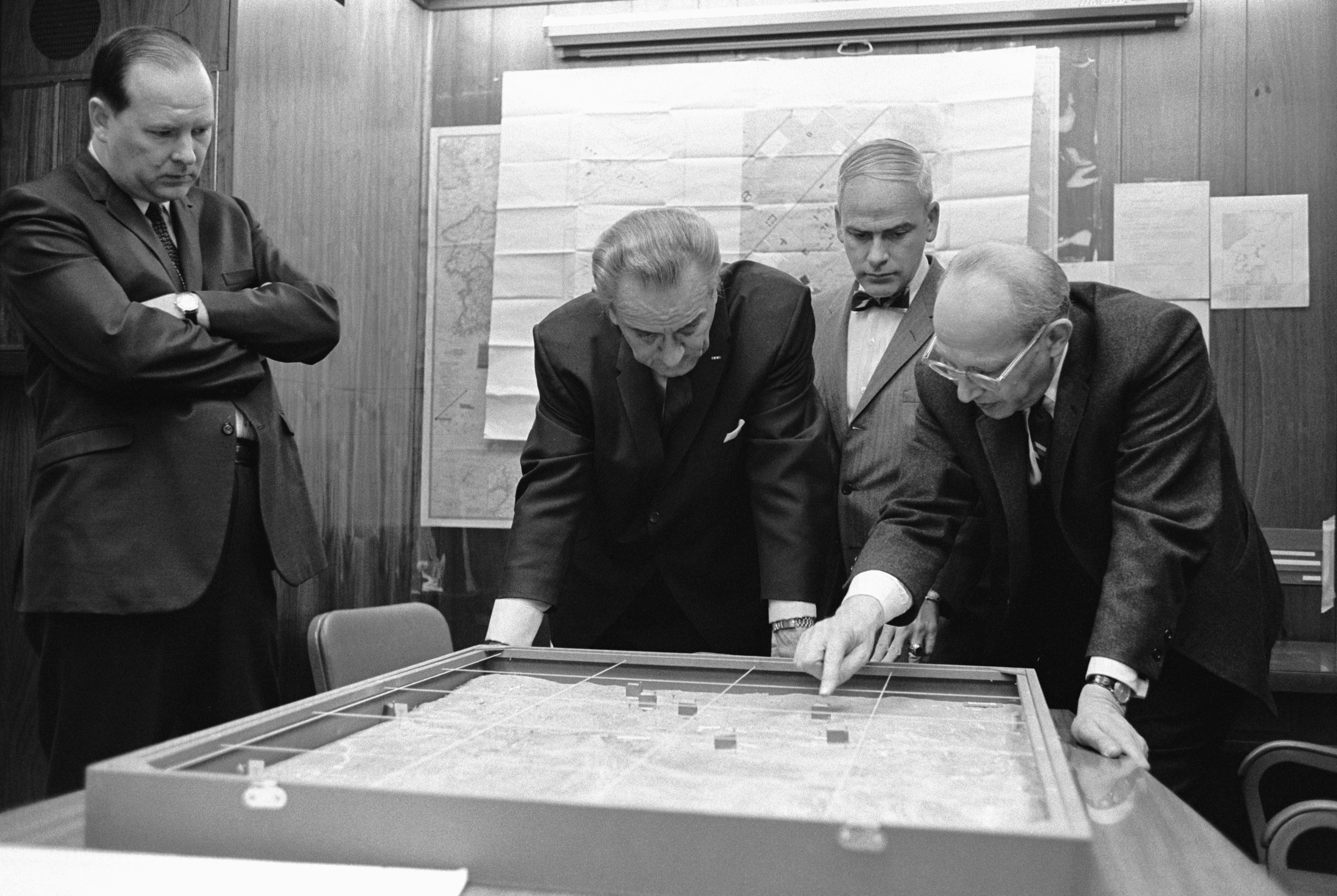
U.S. President Lyndon Johnson and aides examining a model of a U.S. position in South Vietnam.

Sigma II-64 was scheduled as a follow-up to Sigma I-64. It was designed, run, and umpired by the RAND Corporation. It took place between 8 and 17 September 1964. It was posed to answer three concerns of the U.S. military: Would bombing the Democratic Republic of Vietnam hinder its support of the southern insurgency? Conversely, would the bombing help the south? And would they affect joint operations by the People's Army of Vietnam and the Viet Cong?

Overall, game results were discouraging. Vietnam's agricultural economy was largely self-sustaining, with imported foreign aid supplying its technological needs. With game play so closely paralleling real life plans and events, it was concluded that raising the necessary American troops would require a state of national emergency within the United States. The increase in manpower would come at the expense of lessened domestic political support. It would take another military action as prominent as the Tonkin Gulf incident to justify that escalation. Most importantly, Sigma II-64's results undercut the basic assumption that a gradually escalating aerial campaign could lead to U.S. victory. The actual conclusion was that bombing would stiffen the North Vietnamese will to resist.

It was noted that President Johnson could actually duplicate Blue Team's moves in reality. However, the game showed that signaling the communists via differing levels of military aggression was unworkable because hostilities spiraled upwards.

== Sigma I-65 ==
Sigma I-65 was held in May 1965. Players on both Blue and Red Teams were lower level officials, while higher ranking advisors set policy for their teams. Little is known about this simulation.

== Sigma II-65 ==
Sigma II-65 was held by the Joint Chiefs of Staff between 26 July and 5 August 1965. On 5 August 1965, General Maxwell Taylor predicted that the communists being fought in Vietnam would be defeated by year's end. The Sigma II-65 final report was issued on 20 August.

The Sigma II-65 war game's simulated results contradicted General William Westmoreland's strategy of attrition warfare as being capable of ending the war. As a result, Secretary of Defense Robert McNamara began to doubt the general's expertise.

== Sigma I-66 ==
Sigma I-66 was staged in September 1966. Its focus was managing de-escalation of the war if the communists were willing to begin negotiating instead of fighting.

== Sigma II-66 ==
Sigma II-66 differed in that it was played to explore the effects of an outbreak of peace in Vietnam. It was based on the concept that the Vietnam War would dwindle away into defeat for the communists. To end the game, Ho Chi Minh made a secret offer to the U.S. to end hostilities. His requested quid pro quo was an end to the bombing campaign, withdrawal of U.S. troops from the south, and free elections there. By game's end, the Viet Cong were deemed the winners.

== Sigma I-67 and Sigma II-67 ==
Both these Sigma war games were staged between 27 November and 7 December 1967. Their focus was on settling the war.

== War game parallels with reality ==
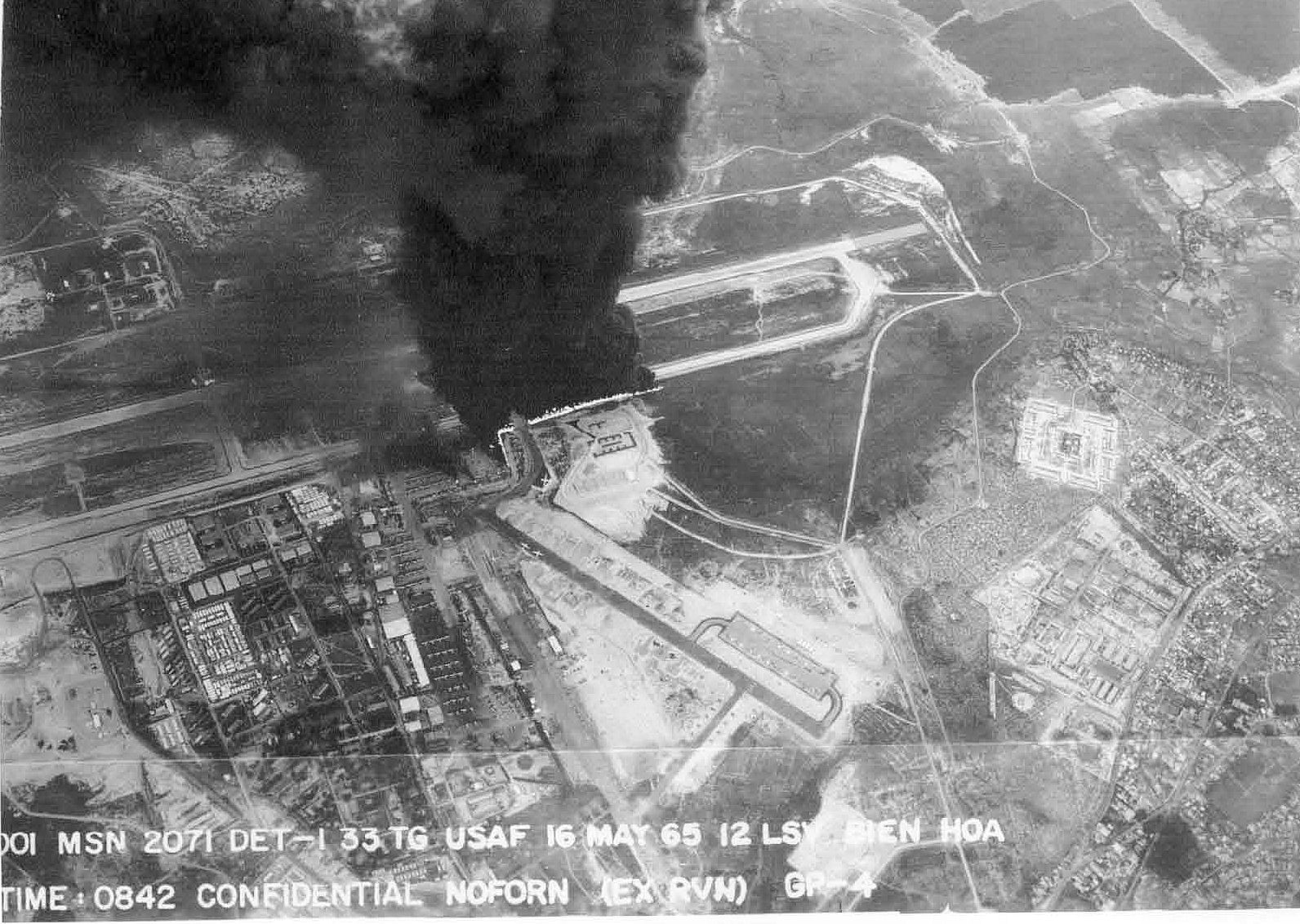
A fire at Bien Hoa airbase. Sigma predicted that a counter to increased U.S. air power would be the bombardment of airfields.

Sigma's game play was realistic enough that several plays would be replicated by actual events:

Sigma I-64 began on an imaginary 15 June 1964 with the capture of an American pilot. As Deputy Secretary of State Seymour Weiss critiqued Sigma I-64: "The eventual capture of a US airman is a high probability and would give 'hard' evidence of US involvement." Coincidentally, in reality it turned out that U.S. Navy pilot Charles Frederick Klusmann was actually shot down and captured in the Kingdom of Laos on 6 June 1964.

In Sigma II-64, it was predicted that General Nguyen Khanh would be pressured out of office on 1 April 1965. In real life, anti-Khanh riots broke out in November 1964, and he fled from his nation in February 1965.

Sigma II-64 also predicted that the communists would parry American air power by bombarding airfields. When the real 1 November 1964 arrived, the Viet Cong shelled airfields at Danang and Bien Hoa for the first time, destroying six Martin B-57 Canberras.

The proposed introduction of American infantry on 26 February 1965 per Sigma II-64 really happened on 8 March 1965 when U.S. Marines landed at Danang. In both the simulation and the reality, the U.S. aim was defense of its air assets.

French President Charles de Gaulle called for the United States withdrawal from Vietnam in September 1966.

Another element of the Sigma II-64 scenario was a deadly ambush of an American battalion near Tchepone that inflicted heavy casualties. In actuality, South Vietnamese troops during Operation Lam Son 719 in 1971 would suffer heavy casualties near Tchepone.

Haiphong harbor was mined in May 1972.

Prominent military historian H. R. McMaster terms the Sigma war games results as "eerily prophetic".
