= Robert F. Kennedy =

American politician and lawyer (1925–1968)

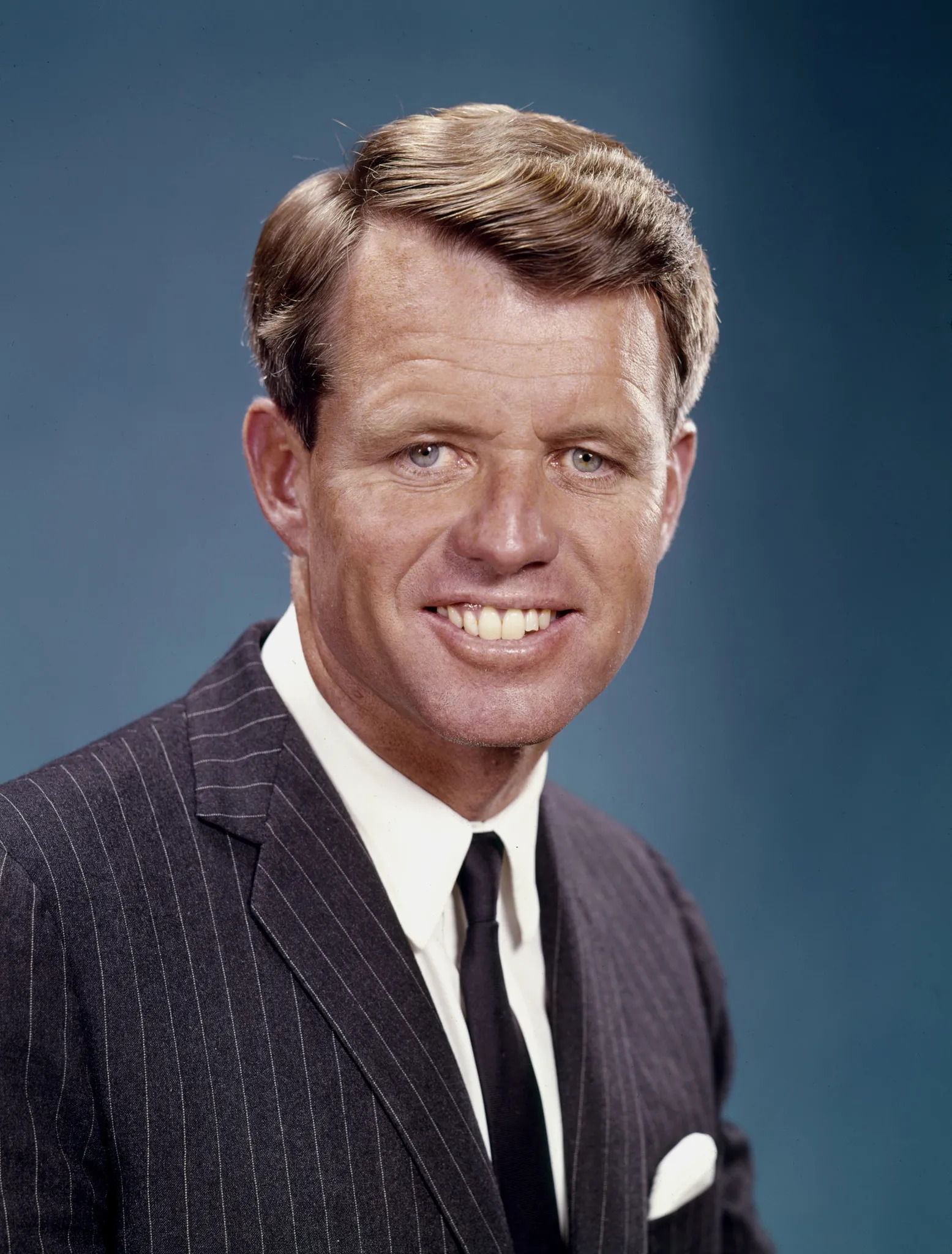
- Kennedy in 1964

64th United States Attorney General
- In office January 21, 1961 – September 3, 1964
- President: John F. Kennedy; Lyndon B. Johnson
- Preceded by: William P. Rogers
- Succeeded by: Nicholas Katzenbach

United States Senator from New York
- In office January 3, 1965 – June 6, 1968
- Preceded by: Kenneth Keating
- Succeeded by: Charles Goodell

Personal details
- Born: Robert Francis Kennedy; November 20, 1925 Brookline, Massachusetts, U.S.
- Died: June 6, 1968 (aged 42) Los Angeles, California, U.S.
- Cause of death: Assassination by gunshot
- Resting place: Arlington National Cemetery
- Party: Democratic
- Spouse: Ethel Skakel (m. 1950)
- Children: 11, including Kathleen, Joseph II, Robert Jr., Michael, Kerry, Chris, Max, Douglas, and Rory
- Parents: Joseph P. Kennedy Sr.; Rose Fitzgerald
- Relatives: Kennedy family
- Education: Harvard University (AB); University of Virginia (LLB)

Military service
- Allegiance: United States
- Branch/service: United States Naval Reserve
- Years of service: 1944–1946
- Rank: Seaman apprentice
- Unit: USS Joseph P. Kennedy Jr.
- Battles/wars: World War II
- Robert F. Kennedy's voice Kennedy's address to students at Day of Affirmation ceremonies at the University of Cape Town, Cape Town, South Africa; Recorded 1966

Robert Francis Kennedy (November 20, 1925 – June 6, 1968), also known by his initials RFK, was an American politician and lawyer. A member of the Democratic Party, Kennedy served as the 64th United States attorney general from 1961 to 1964, and as a U.S. senator from New York from 1965 until his assassination in 1968. Like his brothers John F. Kennedy and Ted Kennedy, he is considered an icon of American liberalism in the 20th century.

Born into the prominent Kennedy family in Brookline, Massachusetts, Kennedy attended Harvard University, and later received his law degree from the University of Virginia. He began his career as a correspondent for The Boston Post and as a lawyer at the Justice Department, but later resigned to manage his brother John's successful campaign for the U.S. Senate in 1952. The following year, Kennedy worked as an assistant counsel to the Senate committee chaired by Senator Joseph McCarthy. He gained national attention as the chief counsel of the Senate Labor Rackets Committee from 1957 to 1959, where he publicly challenged Teamsters president Jimmy Hoffa over the union's corrupt practices. Kennedy resigned from the committee to conduct his brother's successful campaign in the 1960 presidential election. He was appointed United States attorney general at the age of 35, one of the youngest cabinet members in American history. Kennedy served as John's closest advisor until the latter's assassination in 1963.

Kennedy's tenure is known for his advocacy for the civil rights movement, the fight against organized crime, and his involvement in U.S. foreign policy related to Cuba. He authored his account of the Cuban Missile Crisis in a book titled Thirteen Days. As attorney general, Kennedy authorized the Federal Bureau of Investigation (FBI) to wiretap Martin Luther King Jr. and the Southern Christian Leadership Conference on a limited basis. After his brother John was assassinated, he remained in office during the presidency of Lyndon B. Johnson for several months. Kennedy left to run for the U.S. Senate from New York in 1964 and defeated Republican incumbent Kenneth Keating, overcoming criticism that he was a "carpetbagger" from Massachusetts. In office, he opposed U.S. involvement in the Vietnam War and raised awareness of poverty by sponsoring legislation designed to lure private business to blighted communities (i.e., Bedford Stuyvesant Restoration project). Kennedy was an advocate for issues related to human rights and social justice by traveling abroad to eastern Europe, Latin America, and South Africa, and formed working relationships with Martin Luther King Jr., Cesar Chavez, and Walter Reuther.

During the 1968 presidential election, Kennedy became a leading candidate for the Democratic nomination for the presidency by appealing to poor, African American, Hispanic, Catholic, and young voters. His main challenger in the race was Senator Eugene McCarthy. Shortly after winning the California primary around midnight on June 5, 1968, Kennedy was shot by Sirhan Sirhan, a 24-year-old Palestinian, in retaliation for his support of Israel following the 1967 Six-Day War. Kennedy died 25 hours later. The following year, Sirhan was convicted and sentenced to death by gas chamber for Kennedy's assassination, but this was later commuted to life in prison with the possibility of parole in 1972. As with that of his brother, Kennedy's assassination continues to be the subject of widespread analysis and numerous conspiracy theories.

== Early life ==
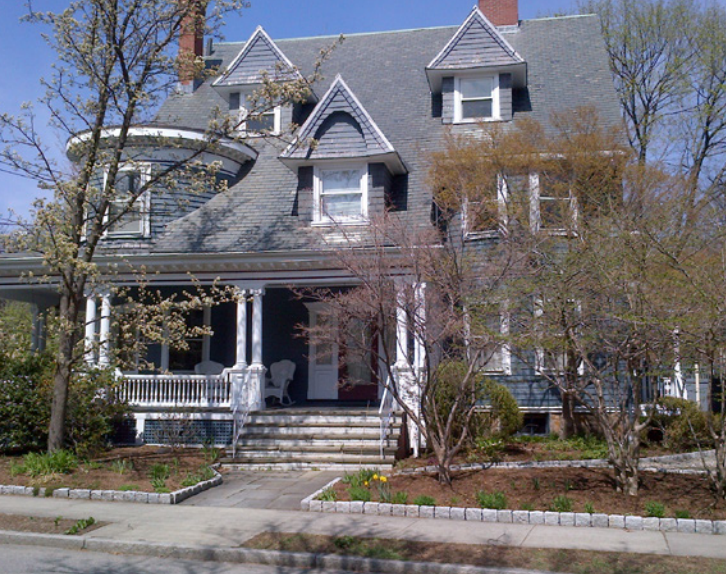
Kennedy's birthplace in Brookline, Massachusetts

Robert Francis Kennedy was born outside Boston in Brookline, Massachusetts on November 20, 1925, to Joseph P. Kennedy Sr., a politician and businessman, and Rose Fitzgerald Kennedy, a philanthropist and socialite. He was the seventh of their nine children. Robert described his position in the family hierarchy by saying that "When you come from that far down, you have to struggle to survive." His parents were members of two prominent Irish-American families that were active in the Massachusetts Democratic Party. All four of Kennedy's grandparents were children of Irish immigrants. His eight siblings were Joseph Jr., John, Rosemary, Kathleen, Eunice, Patricia, Jean, and Ted.

Starting from a solidly middle-class family in Boston, his father amassed a fortune and established trust funds for his nine children that guaranteed lifelong financial security. Turning to politics, Joe Sr. became a leading figure in the Democratic Party and had the money and connections to play a central role in the family's political ambitions. During Robert's childhood, his father dubbed him the "runt" of the family and wrote him off. He focused greater attention on his two eldest sons, Joseph Jr., and John. His parents involved their children in discussions of history and current affairs at the family dinner table. "I can hardly remember a mealtime," Kennedy reflected, "when the conversation was not dominated by what Franklin D. Roosevelt was doing or what was happening in the world. ...Since public affairs had dominated so much of our actions and discussions, public life seemed really an extension of family life."

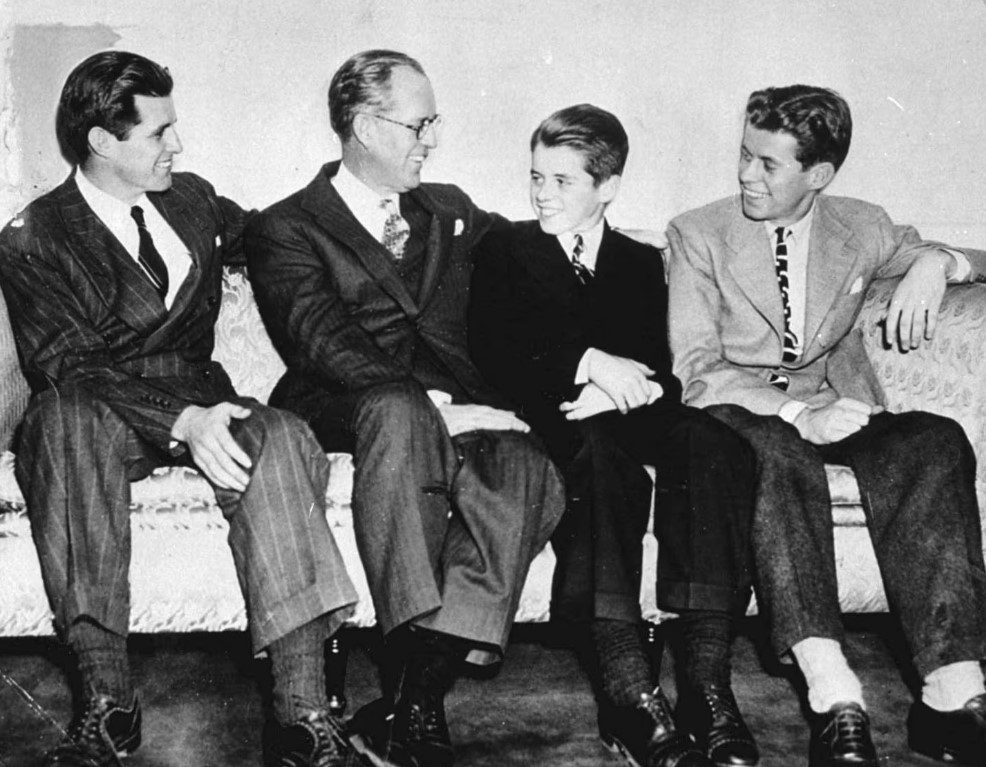
Ambassador Joseph Kennedy Sr. visits his sons (Robert, second from right) in Boston c. 1939.

Kennedy was raised at the Kennedy Compound in Hyannis Port, Massachusetts; La Querida in Palm Beach, Florida; and Bronxville, New York; as well as London, where his father served as the U.S. ambassador to the Court of St James's from 1938 to 1940. When the Kennedy family returned to the United States just before the outbreak of World War II in Europe, Robert was shipped off to an assortment of boarding schools in New England: St. Paul's, a Protestant school in Concord, New Hampshire; Portsmouth Priory, a Benedictine Catholic school in Portsmouth, Rhode Island; then, in September 1942, to Milton Academy, a preparatory school near Boston in Milton, Massachusetts, for 11th and 12th grades. Kennedy graduated from Milton in May 1944. Kennedy later said that, during childhood, he was "going to different schools, always having to make new friends, and that I was very awkward ... [a]nd I was pretty quiet most of the time. And I didn't mind being alone."

At Milton Academy, Kennedy met and became friends with David Hackett. Hackett admired Kennedy's determination to bypass his shortcomings, and remembered him redoubling his efforts whenever something did not come easy to him, which included athletics, studies, success with girls, and popularity. Hackett remembered the two of them as "misfits", a commonality that drew him to Kennedy, along with an unwillingness to conform to how others acted even if doing so meant not being accepted. He had an early sense of virtue; he disliked dirty jokes and bullying, once stepping in when an upperclassman tried bothering a younger student. The headmaster at Milton would later summarize that he was a "very intelligent boy, quiet and shy, but not outstanding, and he left no special mark on Milton".

As a teenager, Kennedy worked as a clerk at the Columbia Trust Company in East Boston, a bank his father had once presided over. While Kennedy found the daily office routine tedious, he enjoyed commuting on the Boston subway, which provided his first sustained contact with those he termed "common folk". His duties included collecting rent from Boston tenement houses, an experience biographers note exposed him to the conditions of urban poverty, including observations of large families living in overcrowded, poorly ventilated flats and residents sleeping on fire escapes.

== Naval service (1944–1946) ==
Six weeks before his 18th birthday in 1943, Kennedy enlisted in the United States Naval Reserve as a seaman apprentice. He was released from active duty in March 1944, when he left Milton Academy early to report to the V-12 Navy College Training Program at Harvard University in Cambridge, Massachusetts from March to November 1944. He was relocated to Bates College in Lewiston, Maine from November 1944 to June 1945, where he received a specialized V-12-degree along with 15 others. During the college's winter carnival, Robert built a snow replica of a Navy boat. He returned to Harvard in June 1945, completing his post-training requirements in January 1946.

Kennedy's oldest brother Joseph Jr. died in August 1944, when his bomber exploded during a volunteer mission known as Operation Aphrodite. Robert was most affected by his father's reaction to his eldest son's passing. He appeared completely heartbroken, and his peer Fred Garfield commented that Kennedy developed depression and questioned his faith for a short time. After his brother's death, Robert gained more attention, moving higher up the family patriarchy. On December 15, 1945, the United States Navy commissioned the destroyer USS Joseph P. Kennedy Jr., and shortly thereafter granted Kennedy's request to be released from naval-officer training to serve aboard Kennedy starting on February 1, 1946, as a seaman apprentice on the ship's shakedown cruise in the Caribbean. On May 30, 1946, he received his honorable discharge from the Navy.

== Further study and journalism (1946–1951) ==
=== College and law school ===
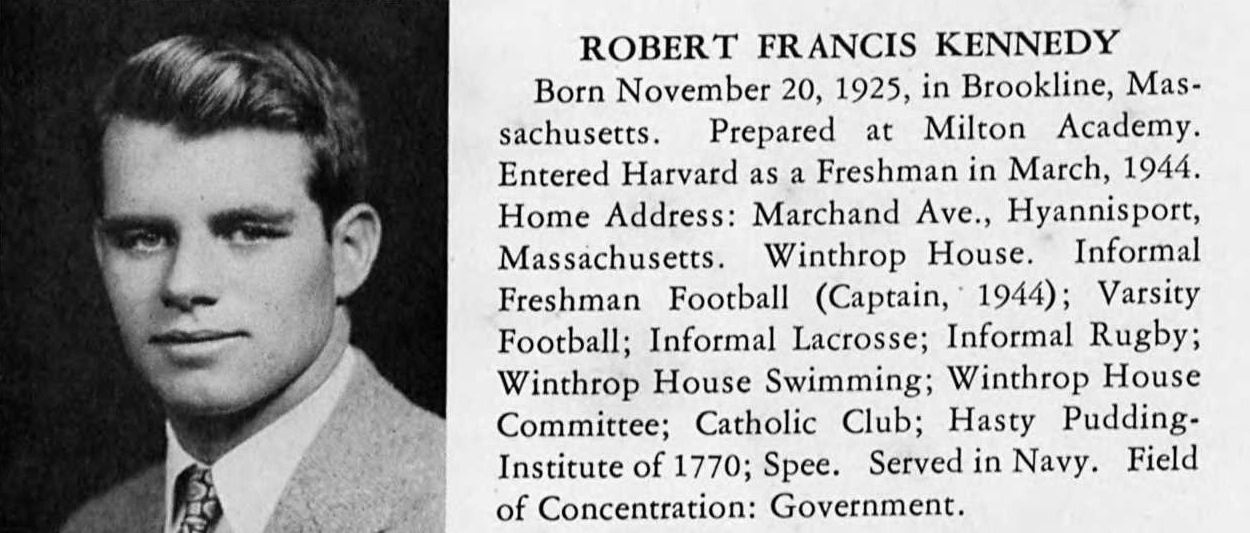
Kennedy in the Harvard University yearbook, 1948

Throughout 1946, Kennedy became active in his brother John's campaign for the U.S. House seat vacated by James Michael Curley; he joined the campaign full-time after his naval discharge. Schlesinger wrote that the election served as an entry into politics for both Robert and John. In September, Kennedy entered Harvard as a junior after receiving credit for his time in the V-12 program. He worked hard to make the Harvard Crimson football team as an end; he was a starter and scored a touchdown in the first game of his senior year before breaking his leg in practice. He earned his varsity letter when his coach sent him in wearing a cast during the last minutes of a game against Yale. Kennedy graduated from Harvard in 1948 with a bachelor's degree in political science.

In September 1948, he enrolled at the University of Virginia School of Law in Charlottesville. Kennedy adapted to this new environment, being elected president of the Student Legal Forum, where he successfully produced outside speakers including James M. Landis, William O. Douglas, Arthur Krock, Joseph McCarthy, and his brother John F. Kennedy. Kennedy's paper on Yalta, written during his senior year, is deposited in the Law Library's Treasure Trove. He graduated from law school in June 1951, finishing 56th in a class of 125.

=== The Boston Post ===
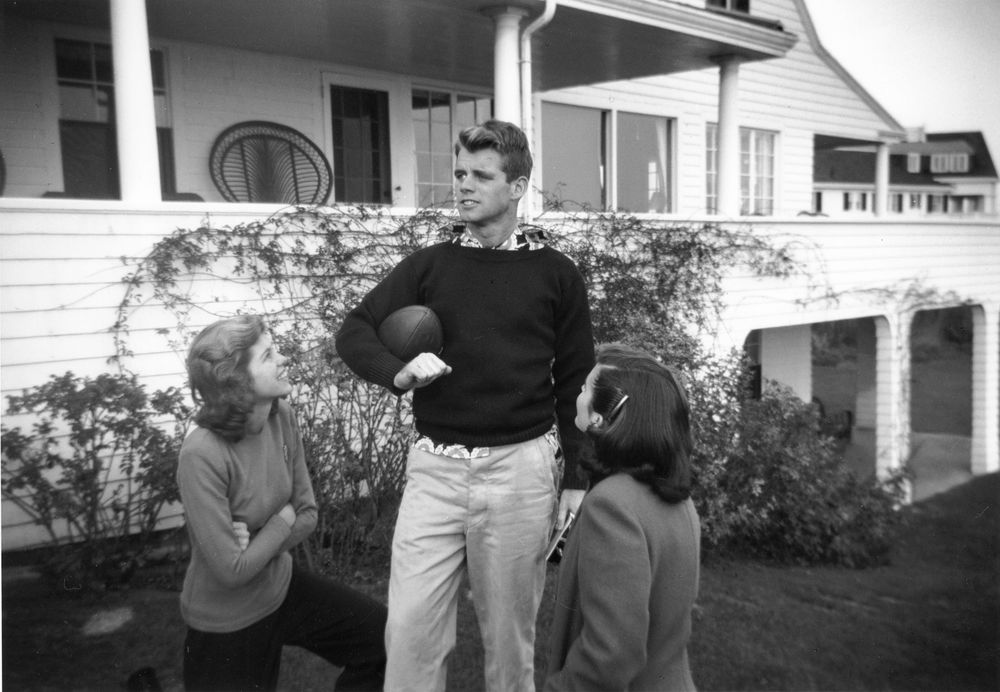
Kennedy (with sisters Eunice and Jean) holding a football at the family's Massachusetts home, c. November 1948

Upon graduating from Harvard, Kennedy sailed on the RMS Queen Mary with a college friend for a tour of Europe and the Middle East, accredited as a correspondent for The Boston Post, filing six stories. Four of these stories, submitted from Palestine shortly before the end of the British Mandate, provided a first-hand view of the tensions in the land. He was critical of British policy on Palestine and praised the Jewish people he met there, calling them "hardy and tough". Kennedy predicted that "before too long", the United States and Great Britain would be looking for a Jewish state to preserve a "toehold" of democracy in the region. He held out some hope after seeing Arabs and Jews working side by side but, in the end, feared that the hatred between the groups was too strong and would lead to a war.

In June 1948, Kennedy reported on the Berlin Blockade. He wrote home about the experience: "It is a very moving and disturbing sight to see plane after plane take off amidst a torrent of rain particularly when I was aboard one." In September 1951, a few months after Kennedy graduated from law school, The Boston Post sent him to San Francisco to cover the convention that concluded the Treaty of Peace with Japan.

== Senate committee counsel and political campaigns (1951–1960) ==
=== JFK Senate campaign and Joseph McCarthy (1952–1955) ===
In 1951, Kennedy was admitted to the Massachusetts Bar. That November, he started work as a lawyer in the Internal Security Division of the U.S. Department of Justice, which prosecuted espionage and subversive-activity cases. In February 1952, he was transferred to the Criminal Division to help prepare fraud cases against former officials of the Truman administration before a Brooklyn grand jury. On June 6, 1952, he resigned to manage his brother John's U.S. Senate campaign in Massachusetts. John's victory was of great importance to the Kennedys, elevating him to national prominence and turning him into a serious potential presidential candidate. It was also equally important to Robert, who felt he had succeeded in eliminating his father's negative perceptions of him.

In December 1952, at his father's behest, Kennedy was appointed by family friend Republican Senator Joseph McCarthy as one of 15 assistant counsels to the U.S. Senate Permanent Subcommittee on Investigations. Kennedy disapproved of McCarthy's aggressive methods of garnering intelligence on suspected communists. He resigned in July 1953, but "retained a fondness for McCarthy". The period of July 1953 to January 1954 saw him at "a professional and personal nadir", feeling that he was adrift while trying to prove himself to his family. Kenneth O'Donnell and Larry O'Brien (who worked on John's congressional campaigns) urged Kennedy to consider running for Massachusetts Attorney General in 1954, but he declined.

After a period as an assistant to his father on the Hoover Commission, Kennedy rejoined the Senate committee staff as chief counsel for the Democratic minority in February 1954. That month, McCarthy's chief counsel Roy Cohn subpoenaed Annie Lee Moss, accusing her of membership in the Communist Party. Kennedy revealed that Cohn had called the wrong Annie Lee Moss and he requested the file on Moss from the FBI. FBI director J. Edgar Hoover had been forewarned by Cohn and denied him access, calling Kennedy "an arrogant whippersnapper". When Democrats gained a Senate majority in January 1955, Kennedy became chief counsel and was a background figure in the televised Army–McCarthy hearings of 1954 into McCarthy's conduct. The Moss incident turned Cohn into an enemy, which led to Kennedy assisting Democratic senators in ridiculing Cohn during the hearings. The animosity grew to the point where Cohn had to be restrained after asking Kennedy if he wanted to fight him. For his work on the McCarthy committee, Kennedy was included in a list of Ten Outstanding Young Men of 1954, created by the U.S. Junior Chamber of Commerce. His father had arranged the nomination, his first national award. In 1955, Kennedy was admitted to practice before the United States Supreme Court.

=== Stevenson aide and focus on organized labor (1956–1960) ===
Kennedy was a Massachusetts delegate at the 1956 Democratic National Convention, having replaced Tip O'Neill at the request of his brother, joining in what was ultimately an unsuccessful effort to help John get the vice-presidential nomination. Kennedy went on to work as an aide to Adlai Stevenson II during the 1956 presidential general election which helped him learn how national campaigns worked, in preparation for a future run by his brother, John. Unimpressed with Stevenson, he mentioned a decade later that he had voted for incumbent Dwight D. Eisenhower.

==== Senate Rackets Committee ====
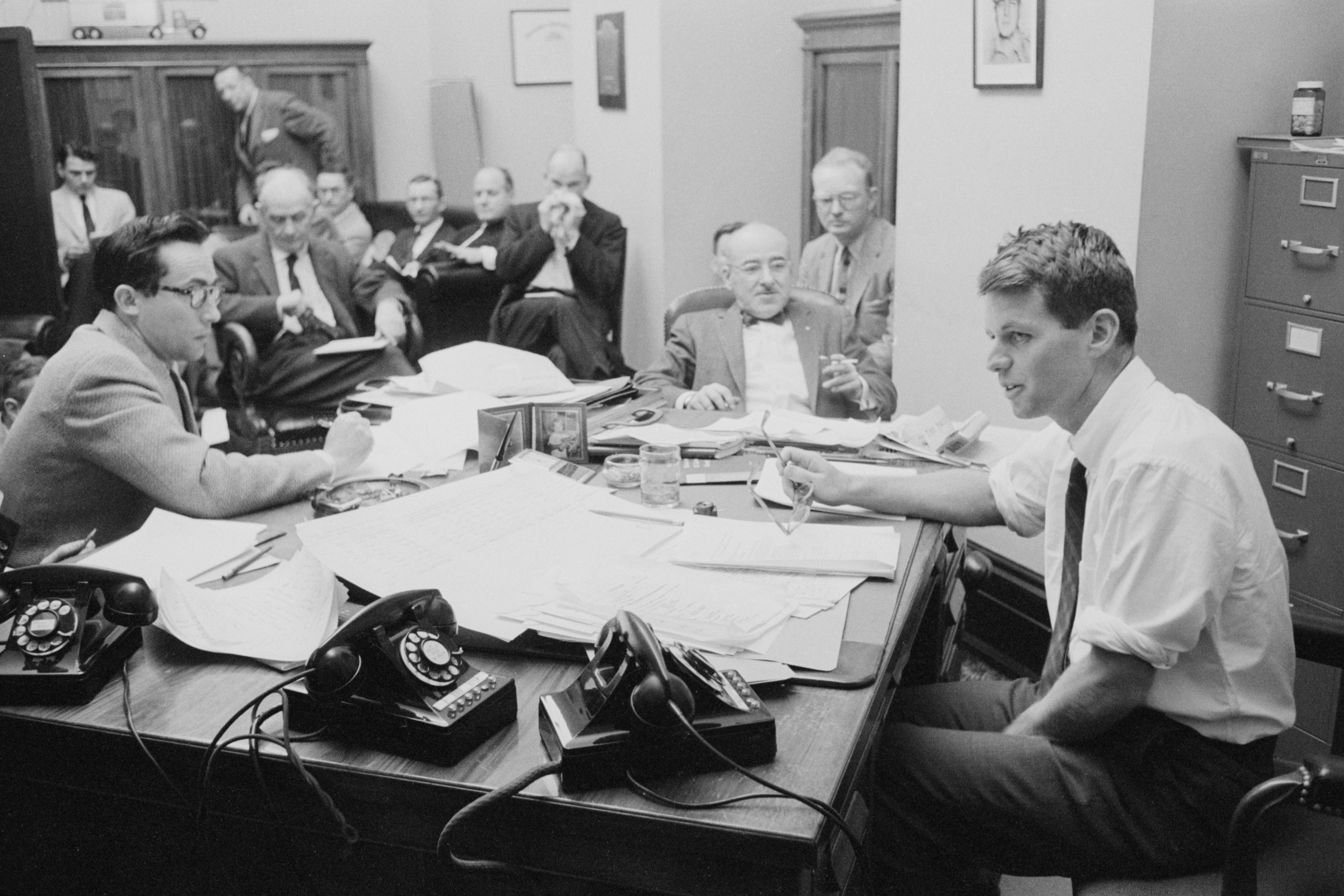
Kennedy, chief counsel to the Senate Rackets Committee, giving a briefing to the press about graft in the Operating Engineers Union, c. January 1958

From 1957 to 1959, Kennedy made a name for himself while serving as the chief counsel to the U.S. Senate's Select Committee on Improper Activities in Labor and Management, nicknamed the McClellan committee after its chairman John L. McClellan, to investigate labor racketeering. Kennedy was given authority over testimony scheduling, areas of investigation, and witness questioning by McClellan, a move that was made by the chairman to limit attention to himself and allow outrage by organized labor to be directed toward Kennedy.

Under Kennedy's relentless direction, the McClellan committee exposed the corruption and fraud, including the misuse of union pension funds, of the Teamsters Union, resulting in the conviction of its president, Dave Beck, and the indictment of his successor, Jimmy Hoffa. Kennedy's face-off with Hoffa attracted national attention. Glossy magazines like Life ("Young Man with Tough Questions") and The Saturday Evening Post ("The Amazing Kennedys") helped raise the Kennedy profile. "Two boyish young men from Boston," wrote a Look magazine reporter, "have become hot tourist attractions in Washington."

During the hearings, Kennedy received criticism from liberal critics and other commentators both for his outburst of impassioned anger and doubts about the innocence of those who invoked the Fifth Amendment. Senators Barry Goldwater and Karl Mundt wrote to each other and complained about "the Kennedy boys" having hijacked the McClellan Committee by their focus on Hoffa and the Teamsters. They believed Kennedy covered for Walter Reuther and the United Automobile Workers (UAW), a union which typically would back Democratic office seekers. Amidst the allegations, Kennedy wrote in his journal that the two senators had "no guts" as they never addressed him directly, only through the press. Kennedy left the committee in September 1959 in order to manage his brother's presidential campaign. The following year, Kennedy published The Enemy Within, a book which described the corrupt practices within the Teamsters and other unions that he had helped investigate.

=== JFK presidential campaign (1960) ===
Kennedy went to work on the presidential campaign of his brother, John. In contrast to his role in his brother's previous campaign eight years prior, Kennedy gave stump speeches throughout the primary season, gaining confidence as time went on. His strategy "to win at any cost" led him to call on Franklin D. Roosevelt Jr. to attack Senator Hubert Humphrey as a draft dodger; Roosevelt eventually did make the statement that Humphrey avoided service.

Concerned that John Kennedy was going to receive the Democratic Party's nomination, some supporters of Lyndon Johnson, who was also running for the nomination, revealed to the press that John had Addison's disease, saying that he required life-sustaining cortisone treatments. Though in fact a diagnosis had been made, Robert tried to protect his brother by denying the allegation, saying that John had never had "an ailment described classically as Addison's disease". After securing the nomination, John Kennedy nonetheless chose Johnson as his vice-presidential nominee. Robert, who favored labor leader Walter Reuther, tried unsuccessfully to convince Johnson to turn down the offer, leading him to view Robert with contempt afterward. Robert had already disliked Johnson prior to the presidential campaign, seeing him as a threat to his brother's ambitions.

In October, just a few weeks before the election, Kennedy was involved in securing the release of civil rights leader Martin Luther King Jr. from a jail in Atlanta. He spoke with Georgia Governor Ernest Vandiver and later Judge Oscar Mitchell, after the judge had sentenced King for violating his probation when he protested at a whites-only snack bar.

== U.S. Attorney General (1961–1964) ==
=== Nomination and confirmation ===
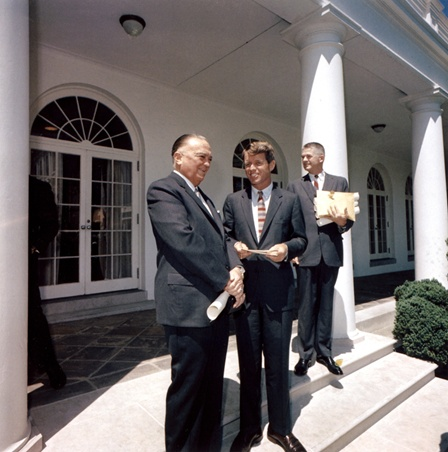
FBI Director J. Edgar Hoover (left), Robert Kennedy (center) and Solicitor General Archibald Cox (right) at the White House on May 7, 1963

After the 1960 presidential election, president-elect John F. Kennedy appointed his younger brother as U.S. attorney general. Despite concerns about the appearance of nepotism, Joseph P. Kennedy Sr. pushed for Robert Kennedy to get the position, in part on the grounds that the president would need someone in his cabinet with whom he had an absolute trust. Both brothers harbored doubts about the proposed appointment, but first John decided it was a good idea and then Robert was persuaded to accept it. The choice was controversial, with publications including The New York Times and The New Republic calling him inexperienced and unqualified. He had no experience in any state or federal court, causing the president to joke, "I can't see that it's wrong to give him a little legal experience before he goes out to practice law."

Republican Senate Minority Leader Everett Dirksen expressed doubts about Kennedy's level of legal experience but found Kennedy competent otherwise and supported the president's ability to choose his own cabinet members. On January 13, Kennedy testified before the Judiciary Committee for two hours, with questioning that was largely friendly. Pressed by Senator Roman Hruska about his lack of experience, Kennedy responded: "In my estimation I think that I have had invaluable experience ... I would not have given up one year of experience that I have had over the period since I graduated from law school for experience practicing law in Boston." At the conclusion of the hearing, Kennedy's nomination received unanimous approval from the committee. The nomination was approved by the full Senate on January 21, 1961, via a division vote, with only one senator standing in opposition.

For the position of Deputy Attorney General, Kennedy chose Byron White, who helped select the rest of the department's staff. These included Archibald Cox as Solicitor General; among the Assistant Attorneys General, Nicholas Katzenbach, Burke Marshall, and Ramsey Clark; and press aides Edwin O. Guthman and John Seigenthaler. The scholars and historians Alexander Bickel, Jeff Shesol, and Evan Thomas have all noted that with these picks, Kennedy showed he was not averse to surrounding himself with very able people who had more qualifications and experience than he did.

Robert Kennedy's influence in the administration extended well beyond law enforcement. Though different in temperament and outlook, the president came to rely heavily on his brother's judgment and effectiveness as political adviser, foreign affairs counselor, and most trusted confidant. Kennedy exercised widespread authority over every cabinet department, leading the Associated Press to dub him "Bobby—Washington's No. 2-man." The president once remarked about his brother, "If I want something done and done immediately I rely on the Attorney General. He is very much the doer in this administration, and has an organizational gift I have rarely if ever seen surpassed."

=== Kennedy administration (1961–1963) ===
==== Organized crime and the Teamsters ====
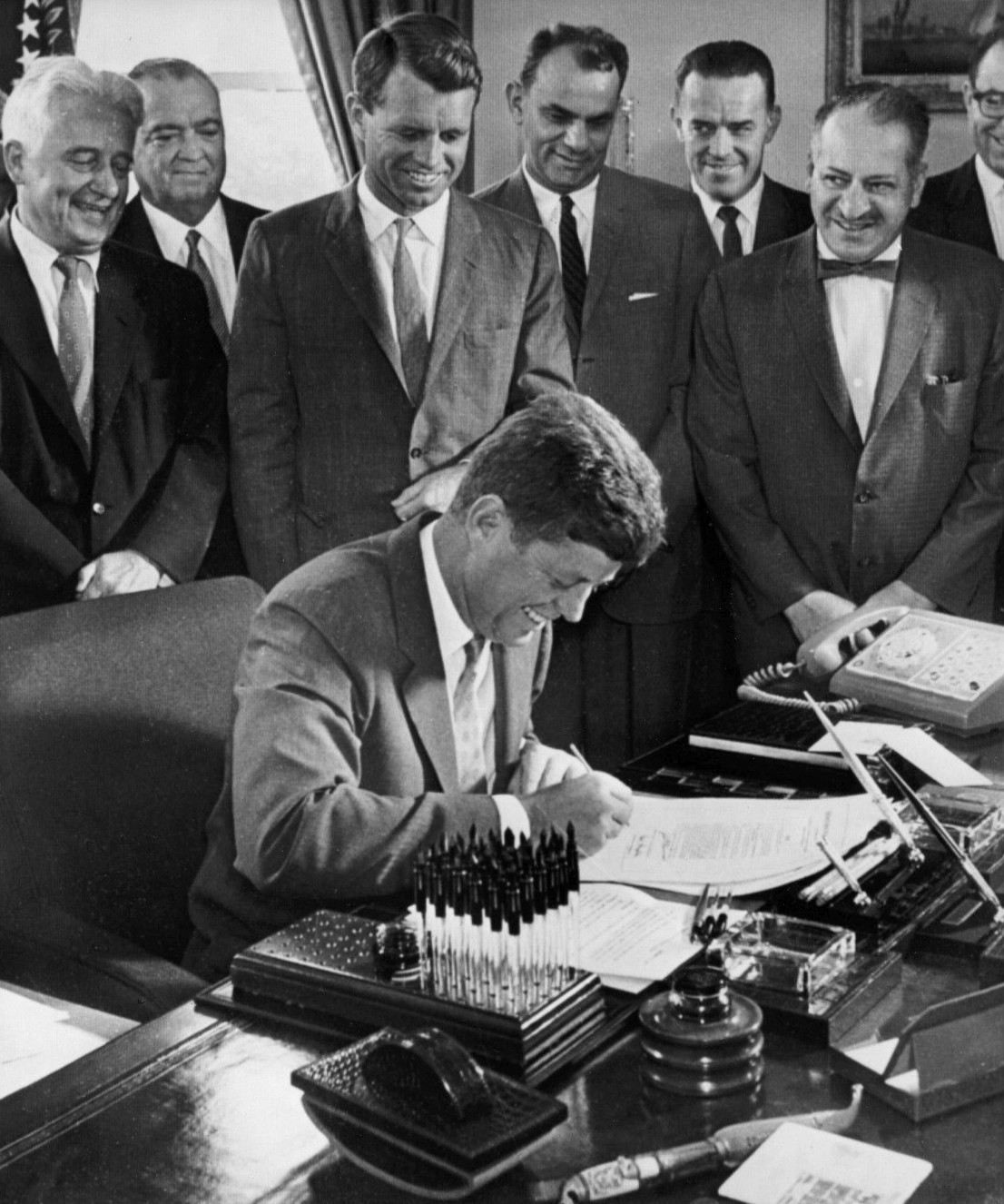
President John F. Kennedy signing anti-crime bills in September 1961. Attorney General Robert Kennedy is in the background.

As attorney general, Kennedy pursued a relentless crusade against organized crime and the Mafia, sometimes disagreeing on strategy with FBI Director J. Edgar Hoover. Through speeches and writing, Kennedy alerted the country to the existence of a "private government of organized crime with an annual income of billions, resting on a base of human suffering and moral corrosion". He established the first coordinated program involving all 26 federal law enforcement agencies to investigate organized crime. The Justice Department targeted prominent Mafia leaders like Carlos Marcello and Joey Aiuppa; Marcello was deported to Guatemala, while Aiuppa was convicted of violating of the Migratory Bird Treaty Act of 1918. Kennedy worked to secure the passage of five anti-crime bills (i.e., Wire Act, Travel Act, and Interstate Transportation of Paraphernalia Act) directed against those who aided interstate racketeering or gambling enterprises or who transported gambling paraphernalia, gambling information by wire, or firearms (by felons) across state lines. Convictions against organized crime figures rose by 800 percent during his term. Kennedy worked to shift Hoover's focus away from communism, which Hoover saw as a more serious threat, to organized crime. According to James Neff, Kennedy's success in this endeavor was due to his brother's position, giving the attorney general leverage over Hoover. Biographer Richard Hack concluded that Hoover's dislike for Kennedy came from his being unable to control him.

He was relentless in his pursuit of Teamsters Union president Jimmy Hoffa, due to Hoffa's known corruption in financial and electoral matters, both personally and organizationally, creating a so-called "Get Hoffa" squad of prosecutors and investigators. The enmity between the two men was intense, with accusations of a personal vendetta—what Hoffa called a "blood feud"—exchanged between them. On July 7, 1961, after Hoffa was reelected to the Teamsters presidency, Kennedy told reporters the government's case against Hoffa had not been changed by what he called "a small group of teamsters" supporting him. The following year, it was leaked that Hoffa had claimed to a Teamster local that Kennedy had been "bodily" removed from his office, the statement being confirmed by a Teamster press agent and Hoffa saying Kennedy had only been ejected. On March 4, 1964, Hoffa was convicted in Chattanooga, Tennessee, of attempted bribery of a grand juror during his 1962 conspiracy trial in Nashville and sentenced to eight years in prison and a $10,000 fine. After learning of Hoffa's conviction by telephone, Kennedy issued congratulatory messages to the three prosecutors. While on bail during his appeal, Hoffa was convicted in a second trial held in Chicago, on July 26, 1964, on one count of conspiracy and three counts of mail and wire fraud for improper use of the Teamsters' pension fund, and sentenced to five years in prison. Hoffa spent the next three years unsuccessfully appealing his 1964 convictions, and began serving his aggregate prison sentence of 13 years (eight years for bribery, five years for fraud) on March 7, 1967, at the Lewisburg Federal Penitentiary in Pennsylvania.

==== Juvenile delinquency ====
In his first press conference as attorney general in 1961, Kennedy spoke of an "alarming increase" in juvenile delinquency. In May 1961, Kennedy was named chairman of the President's Committee on Juvenile Delinquency and Youth Crime (PCJD), with lifelong friend David Hackett as director. After visits to blighted communities, Kennedy and Hackett concluded that delinquency was the result of racial discrimination and lack of opportunities. The committee held that government must not impose solutions but empower the poor to develop their own. The PCJD provided comprehensive services (education, employment, and job training) that encouraged self-sufficiency. In September 1961, the Juvenile Delinquency and Youth Offenses Control Act was signed into law.

==== Civil rights ====
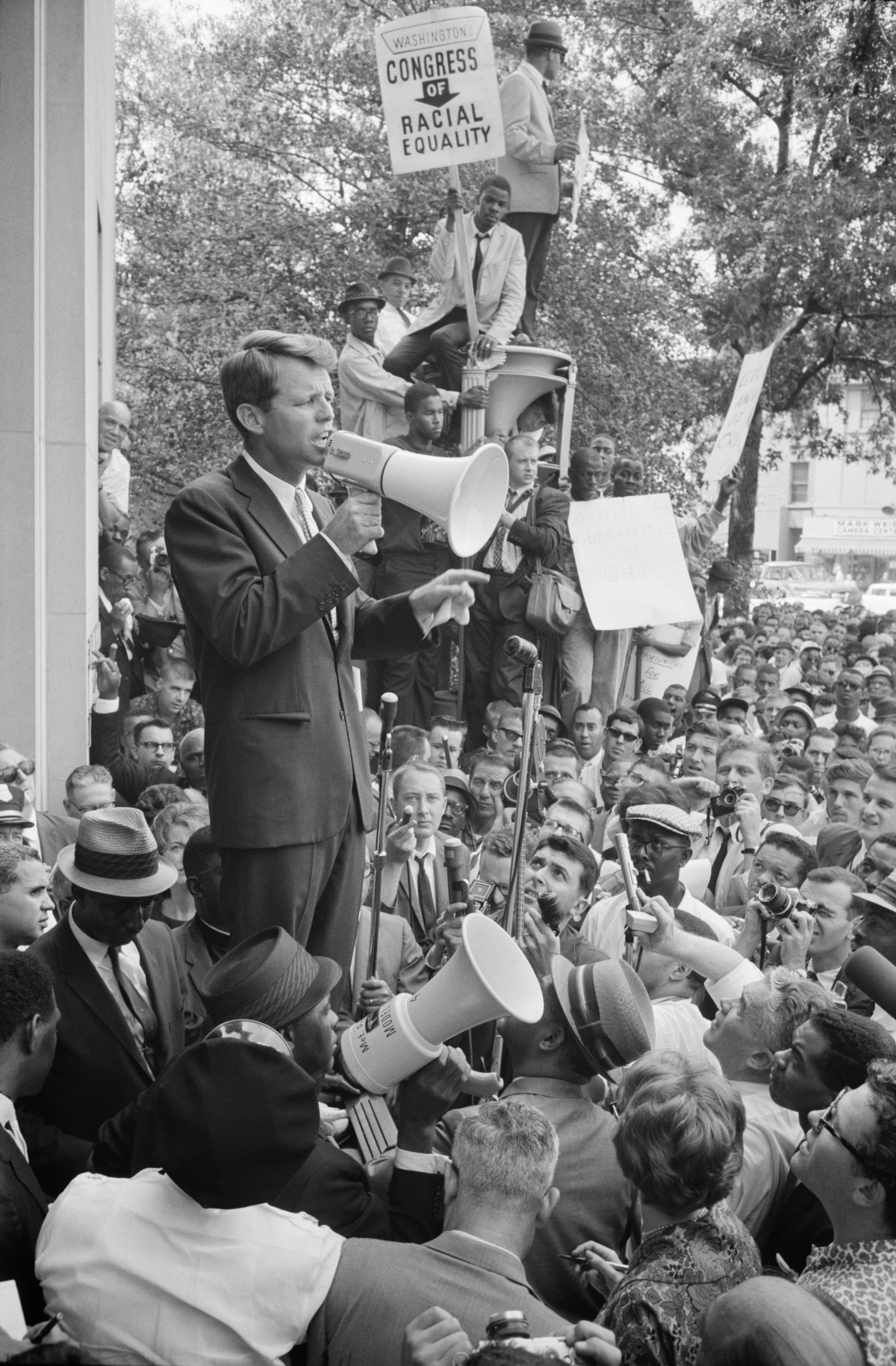
Kennedy speaking to civil rights demonstrators in front of the Department of Justice on June 14, 1963

Kennedy expressed the administration's commitment to civil rights during a May 6, 1961, speech at the University of Georgia School of Law:

Our position is quite clear. We are upholding the law. The federal government would not be running the schools in Prince Edward County any more than it is running the University of Georgia or the schools in my home state of Massachusetts. In this case, in all cases, I say to you today that if the orders of the court are circumvented, the Department of Justice will act. We will not stand by or be aloof—we will move. I happen to believe that the 1954 decision was right. But my belief does not matter. It is now the law. Some of you may believe the decision was wrong. That does not matter. It is the law.

FBI Director J. Edgar Hoover viewed civil rights leader Martin Luther King Jr. as an upstart troublemaker, calling him an "enemy of the state". In February 1962, Hoover presented Kennedy with allegations that some of King's close confidants and advisers were communists. Concerned about the allegations, the FBI deployed agents to monitor King in the following months. Kennedy warned King to discontinue the suspected associations. In response, King agreed to ask suspected communist Jack O'Dell to resign from the Southern Christian Leadership Conference (SCLC), but he refused to heed to the request to ask Stanley Levison, whom he regarded as a trusted advisor, to resign. In October 1963, Kennedy issued a written directive authorizing the FBI to wiretap King and other leaders of the SCLC, King's civil rights organization. Although Kennedy only gave written approval for limited wiretapping of King's phones "on a trial basis, for a month or so", Hoover extended the clearance so that his men were "unshackled" to look for evidence in any areas of King's life they deemed worthy. The wiretapping continued through June 1966 and was revealed in 1968, days before Kennedy's death. Relations between the Kennedys and civil-rights activists could be tense, partly due to the administration's decision that a number of complaints King filed with the Justice Department between 1961 and 1963 be handled "through negotiation between the city commission and Negro citizens".

Kennedy played a large role in the response to the Freedom Riders protests. He acted after the Anniston bus bombing to protect the Riders in continuing their journey, sending John Seigenthaler, his administrative assistant, to Alabama to try to calm the situation. Kennedy called the Greyhound Company and demanded that it obtain a coach operator who was willing to drive a special bus for the continuance of the Freedom Ride from Birmingham to Montgomery, on the circuitous journey to Jackson, Mississippi. Later, during the attack and burning by a white mob of the First Baptist Church in Montgomery, which King and 1,500 sympathizers attended, the attorney general telephoned King to ask for his assurance that they would not leave the building until the U.S. Marshals and National Guard he sent had secured the area. King proceeded to berate Kennedy for "allowing the situation to continue". King later publicly thanked him for dispatching the forces to break up the attack that might otherwise have ended his life. Kennedy then negotiated the safe passage of the Freedom Riders from the First Baptist Church to Jackson, where they were arrested. He offered to bail the Freedom Riders out of jail, but they refused, which upset him. On May 29, 1961, Kennedy petitioned the Interstate Commerce Commission (ICC) to issue regulations banning segregation, and the ICC subsequently decreed that by November 1, bus carriers and terminals serving interstate travel had to be integrated.

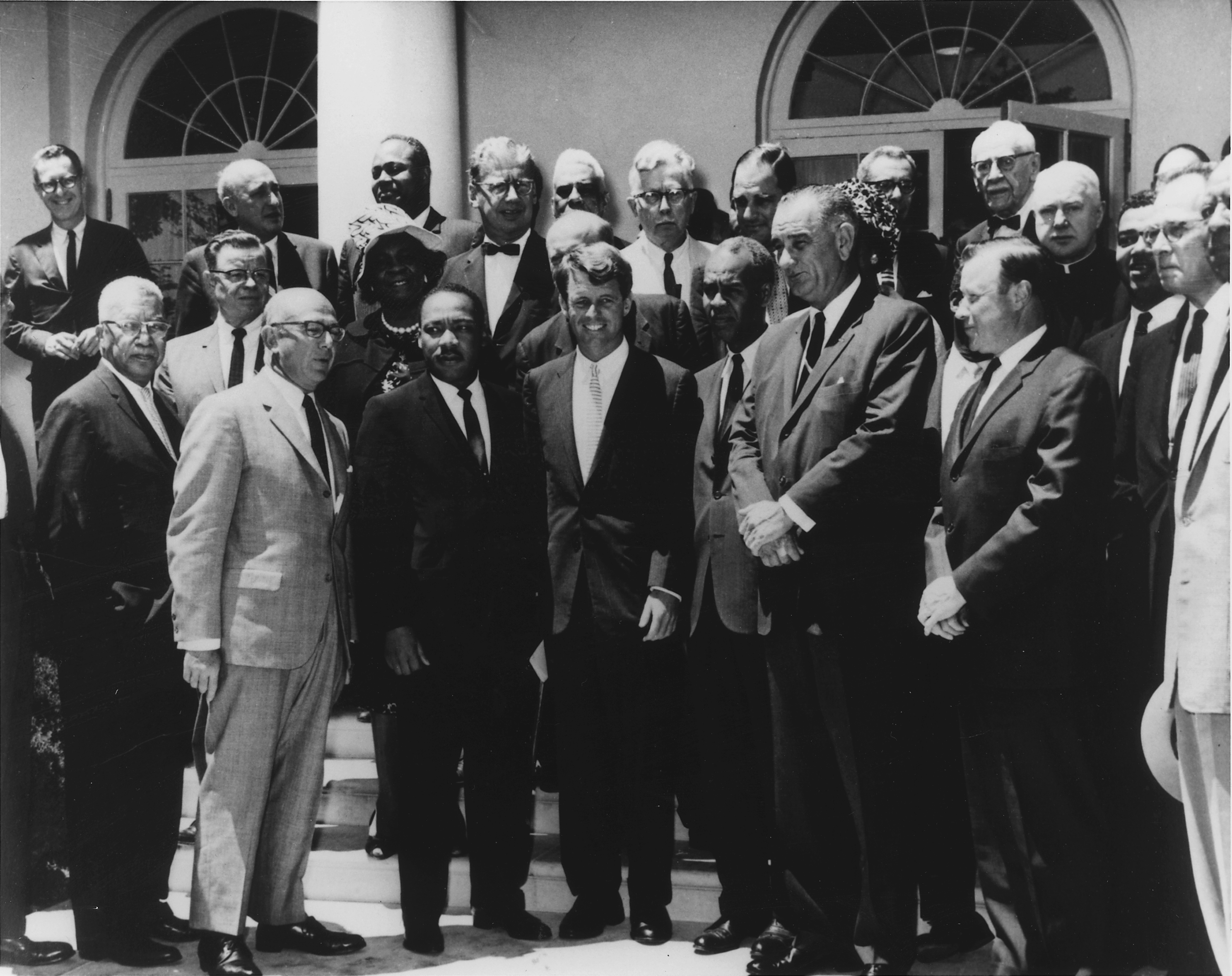
Kennedy and Vice President Lyndon B. Johnson meet with civil rights leaders at the White House on June 22, 1963.

Kennedy's attempts to end the Freedom Rides early were tied to an upcoming summit with Nikita Khrushchev in Vienna. He believed the continued international publicity of race riots would tarnish the president heading into international negotiations. This attempt to curtail the Freedom Rides alienated many civil rights leaders who, at the time, perceived him as intolerant and narrow-minded. Historian David Halberstam wrote that the race question was for a long time a minor ethnic political issue in Massachusetts where the Kennedy brothers came from, and had they been from another part of the country, "they might have been more immediately sensitive to the complexities and depth of black feelings". In an attempt to better understand and improve race relations, Kennedy held a private meeting on May 24, 1963, in New York City with a black delegation coordinated by prominent author James Baldwin. The meeting became antagonistic, and the group reached no consensus. The black delegation generally felt that Kennedy did not understand the full extent of racism in the United States, and only alienated the group more when he tried to compare his family's experience with discrimination as Irish Catholics to the racial injustice faced by African Americans.

In September 1962, Kennedy sent a force of U.S. Marshals, U.S. Border Patrol agents, and deputized federal prison guards to the University of Mississippi, to enforce a federal court order allowing the admittance of the institution's first African American student, James Meredith. The attorney general had hoped that legal means, along with the escort of federal officers, would be enough to force Governor Ross Barnett to allow Meredith's admission. He also was very concerned there might be a "mini-civil war" between federal troops and armed protesters. President Kennedy reluctantly sent federal troops after the situation on campus turned violent. The ensuing Ole Miss riot of 1962 resulted in 300 injuries and two deaths, but Kennedy remained adamant that black students had the right to the benefits of all levels of the educational system.

Kennedy saw voting as the key to racial justice and collaborated with President Kennedy in proposing the landmark Civil Rights Act of 1964, which helped bring an end to Jim Crow laws. Throughout the spring of 1964, Kennedy worked alongside Senator Hubert Humphrey and Senate Minority Leader Everett Dirksen in search of language that could work for the Republican caucus and overwhelm the Southern Democrats' filibuster. In May, a deal was secured that could obtain a two-thirds majority in the Senate—enough votes to close debate. Kennedy did not see the civil rights bill as simply directed at the South and warned of the danger of racial tensions above the Mason–Dixon line. "In the North", he said, "I think you have had de facto segregation, which in some areas is bad or even more extreme than in the South", adding that people in "those communities, including my own state of Massachusetts, concentrated on what was happening in Birmingham, Alabama or Jackson, Mississippi, and didn't look at what was needed to be done in our home, our own town, or our own city." The ultimate solution "is a truly major effort at the local level to deal with the racial problem—Negroes and whites working together, within the structure of the law, obedience to the law, and respect for the law."

Between December 1961 and December 1963, Kennedy also expanded the United States Department of Justice Civil Rights Division by 60 percent.

==== U.S. Steel ====
At the president's direction, Kennedy used the power of federal agencies to influence U.S. Steel not to institute a price increase, and announced a grand jury probe to investigate possible collusion and price fixing by U.S. Steel in collaboration with other major steel manufacturers. The Wall Street Journal wrote that the administration had set prices of steel "by naked power, by threats, by agents of the state security police". Yale law professor Charles Reich wrote in The New Republic that the Justice Department had violated civil liberties by calling a federal grand jury to indict U.S. Steel so quickly, then disbanding it after the price increase did not occur.

==== Berlin ====
As one of the president's closest White House advisers, Kennedy played a crucial role in the events surrounding the Berlin Crisis of 1961. Operating mainly through a private, backchannel connection to Soviet GRU officer Georgi Bolshakov, he relayed important diplomatic communications between the U.S. and Soviet governments. Most significantly, this connection helped the U.S. set up the Vienna Summit in June 1961, and later to defuse the tank standoff with the Soviets at Berlin's Checkpoint Charlie in October. Kennedy's visit with his wife to West Berlin in February 1962 demonstrated U.S. support for the city and helped repair the strained relationship between the administration and its special envoy in Berlin, Lucius D. Clay.

==== Cuba ====
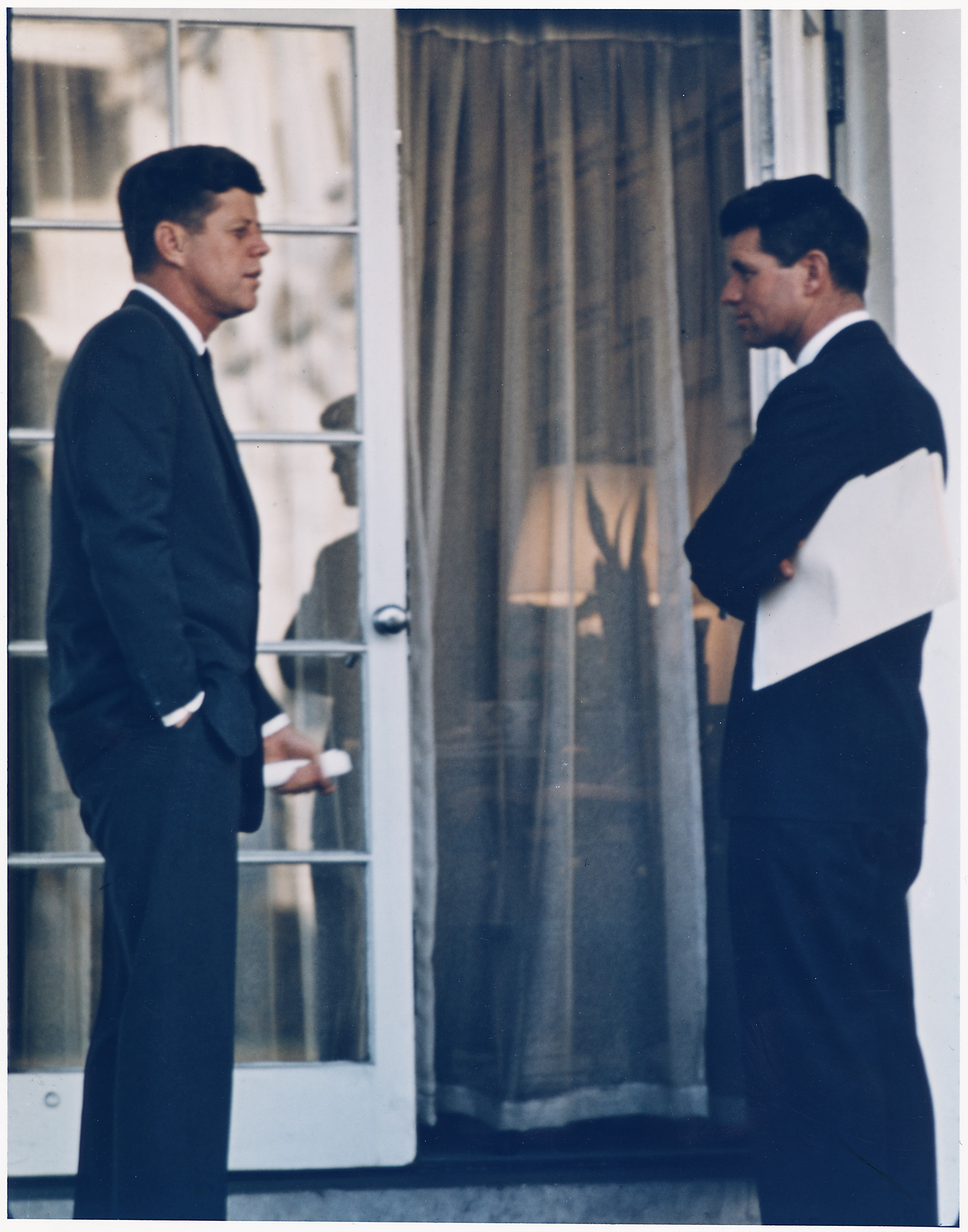
Robert with his brother John, c. 1963

As his brother's confidant, Kennedy oversaw the CIA's anti-Castro activities after the failed Bay of Pigs Invasion in Cuba, which included covert operations that targeted Cuban civilians. He also helped develop the strategy during the Cuban Missile Crisis to blockade Cuba instead of initiating a military strike that might have led to nuclear war.

Allegations that the Kennedys knew of plans by the CIA to kill Fidel Castro, or approved of such plans, have been debated by historians over the years. The "Family Jewels" documents, declassified by the CIA in 2007, suggest that before the Bay of Pigs Invasion, the attorney general personally authorized one such assassination attempt. But there is evidence to the contrary, such as that Kennedy was informed of an earlier plot involving the CIA's use of Mafia bosses Sam Giancana and John Roselli only during a briefing on May 7, 1962, and in fact directed the CIA to halt any existing efforts directed at Castro's assassination. Biographer Thomas concludes that "the Kennedys may have discussed the idea of assassination as a weapon of last resort. But they did not know the particulars of the Harvey-Rosselli operation – or want to." Concurrently, Kennedy served as the president's personal representative in Operation Mongoose, the post–Bay of Pigs covert operations program the president established in November 1961. Mongoose was meant to incite revolution in Cuba that would result in Castro's downfall.

During the Cuban Missile Crisis in October 1962, Kennedy proved himself to be a gifted politician with an ability to obtain compromises, tempering aggressive positions of key figures in the hawk camp. The trust the president placed in him on matters of negotiation was such that his role in the crisis is today seen as having been of vital importance in securing a blockade, which averted a full military engagement between the United States and the Soviet Union. On October 27, Kennedy secretly met with Soviet Ambassador Anatoly Dobrynin. They reached a basic understanding: the Soviet Union would withdraw their missiles from Cuba, subject to United Nations verification, in exchange for a U.S. pledge not to invade Cuba. Kennedy also informally proposed that the Jupiter MRBMs in Turkey would be removed "within a short time after this crisis was over". On the last night of the crisis, President Kennedy was so grateful for his brother's work in averting nuclear war that he summed it up by saying, "Thank God for Bobby." Kennedy authored his account of the crisis in a book titled Thirteen Days (posthumously published in 1969).

==== Japan ====
At a summit meeting with Japanese prime minister Hayato Ikeda in Washington D.C. in 1961, President Kennedy promised to make a reciprocal visit to Japan in 1962, but the decision to resume atmospheric nuclear testing forced him to postpone such a visit, and he sent Robert in his stead. Kennedy arrived in Tokyo in February 1962 at a very sensitive time in U.S.-Japan relations, shortly after the massive Anpo protests against the U.S.-Japan Security Treaty had highlighted anti-American grievances. Kennedy won over a highly skeptical Japanese public and press with his cheerful, open demeanor, sincerity, and youthful energy. Most famously, Kennedy scored a public relations coup during a nationally televised speech at Waseda University in Tokyo. When radical Marxist student activists from Zengakuren attempted to shout him down, he calmly invited one of them on stage and engaged the student in an impromptu debate. Kennedy's calmness under fire and willingness to take the student's questions seriously won many admirers in Japan and praise from the Japanese media, both for himself and on his brother's behalf.

==== Assassination of John F. Kennedy ====
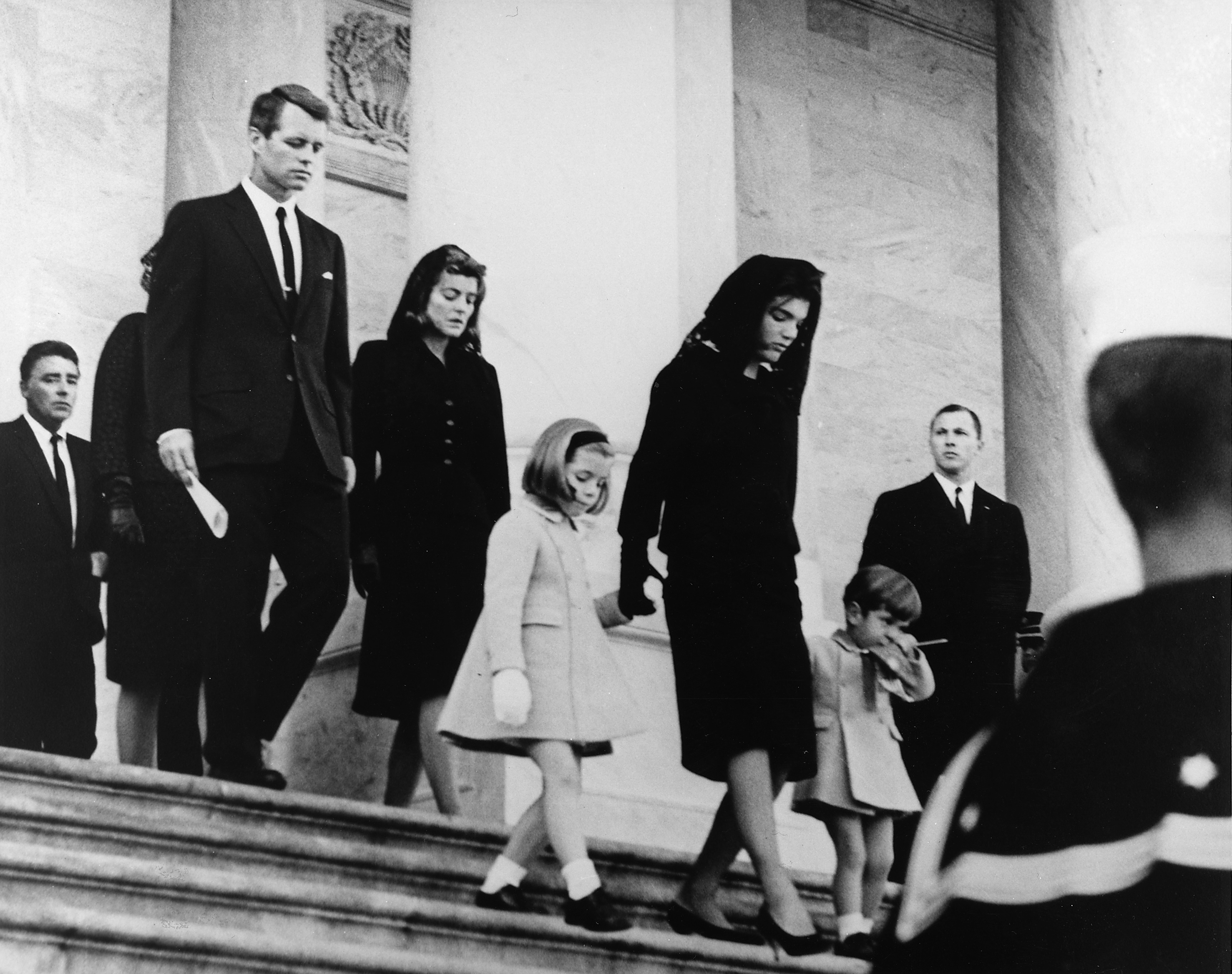
Robert Kennedy at the funeral of his brother, President John F. Kennedy, on November 25, 1963

When President Kennedy was assassinated in Dallas on November 22, 1963, Robert Kennedy was at home with aides from the Justice Department. J. Edgar Hoover called and told him his brother had been shot. Hoover then hung up before he could ask any questions. Kennedy later said he thought Hoover had enjoyed telling him the news. Shortly after the call from Hoover, Kennedy phoned McGeorge Bundy at the White House, instructing him to change the locks on the president's files. He ordered the Secret Service to dismantle the hidden taping system in the Oval Office and cabinet room. He scheduled a meeting with CIA director John McCone and asked if the CIA had any involvement in his brother's death. McCone denied it, with Kennedy later telling investigator Walter Sheridan that he asked the director "in a way that he couldn't lie to me, and they [the CIA] hadn't".

An hour after the president was shot, Robert Kennedy received a phone call from the newly ascended President Johnson before Johnson boarded Air Force One. Kennedy remembered their conversation starting with Johnson demonstrating sympathy before stating his belief that he should be sworn in immediately; Robert Kennedy opposed the idea since he felt "it would be nice" for President Kennedy's body to return to Washington with the deceased president still being the incumbent. Eventually, the two concluded that the best course of action would be for Johnson to take the oath of office before returning to Washington. In his 1971 book We Band of Brothers, aide Edwin O. Guthman recounted Kennedy admitting to him an hour after receiving word of his brother's death that he thought he would be the one "they would get" as opposed to his brother. In the days following the assassination, he wrote letters to his two eldest children, Kathleen and Joseph, saying that as the oldest Kennedy family members of their generation, they had a special responsibility to remember what their uncle had started and to love and serve their country. He was originally opposed to Jacqueline Kennedy's decision to have a closed casket, as he wanted the funeral to keep with tradition, but he changed his mind after seeing the cosmetic, waxen remains.

The ten-month investigation by the Warren Commission concluded that the president had been assassinated by Lee Harvey Oswald and that Oswald had acted alone. On September 27, 1964, Kennedy issued a statement through his New York campaign office: "As I said in Poland last summer, I am convinced Oswald was solely responsible for what happened and that he did not have any outside help or assistance. He was a malcontent who could not get along here or in the Soviet Union." He added, "I have not read the report, nor do I intend to. But I have been briefed on it and I am completely satisfied that the Commission investigated every lead and examined every piece of evidence. The Commission's inquiry was thorough and conscientious." After a meeting with Kennedy in 1966, historian Arthur M. Schlesinger Jr. wrote: "It is evident that he believes that [the Warren Commission's report] was a poor job and will not endorse it, but that he is unwilling to criticize it and thereby reopen the whole tragic business." According to Soviet archives, William Walton was sent to the Soviet Union by Robert Kennedy in the days after the assassination of his brother. He was to go there for the purposes of cultural diplomacy but was also told to meet with Russian diplomat Georgi Bolshakov and deliver a message. Walton told Bolshakov that Robert and Jackie Kennedy believed there was a conspiracy involved in the killing of President Kennedy and informed him that Robert Kennedy shared the views of his brother in his approach to peace with the Soviet Union.

The assassination was judged as having a profound impact on Kennedy. Michael Beran assesses the assassination as having moved Kennedy away from reliance on the political system and to become more questioning. Larry Tye views Kennedy following the death of his brother as "more fatalistic, having seen how fast he could lose what he cherished the most."

=== Johnson administration (1963–1964) ===
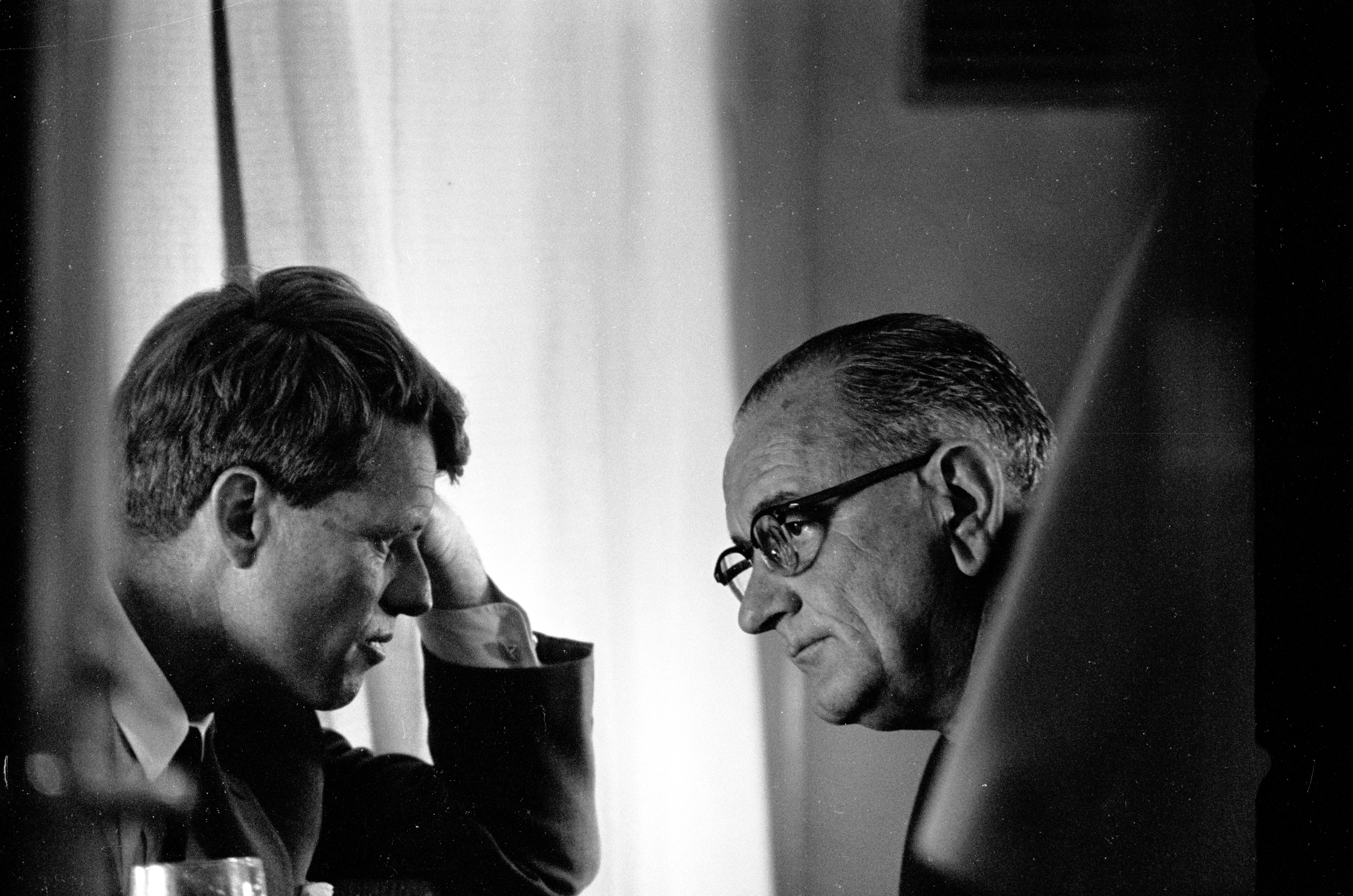
Kennedy meeting with President Lyndon Johnson at the White House on October 14, 1964

==== The "Bobby problem" ====
In the wake of the assassination of his brother and Lyndon Johnson's ascension to the presidency, with the office of vice president now vacant, Kennedy was viewed favorably as a potential candidate for the position in the 1964 presidential election. Johnson faced pressure from some within the Democratic Party to name Kennedy as his running mate, which Johnson staffers referred to internally as the "Bobby problem." It was an open secret that they disliked each other, and Johnson had no intention of remaining in the shadow of another Kennedy. At the time, Johnson privately said of Kennedy, "I don't need that little runt to win", while Kennedy privately said of Johnson that he was "mean, bitter, vicious—an animal in many ways." An April 1964 Gallup poll reported Kennedy as the vice-presidential choice of 47 percent of Democratic voters. Coming in a distant second and third were Adlai Stevenson II with 18 percent and Hubert Humphrey with 10 percent.

Although Johnson confided to aides on several occasions that he might be forced to accept Kennedy in order to secure a victory over a moderate Republican ticket such as Nelson Rockefeller and George Romney, Kennedy supporters attempted to force the issue by running a draft movement during the New Hampshire primary. This movement gained momentum after Governor John W. King's endorsement and infuriated Johnson. Kennedy received 25,094 write in votes for vice president in New Hampshire, far surpassing Senator Hubert Humphrey, the eventual vice-presidential nominee. The potential need for a Johnson–Kennedy ticket was ultimately eliminated by the Republican nomination of conservative Barry Goldwater. With Goldwater as his opponent, Johnson's choice of vice president was all but irrelevant; opinion polls had revealed that, while Kennedy was an overwhelming first choice among Democrats, any choice made less than a 2% difference in a general election that already promised to be a landslide.

During a post-presidency interview with historian Doris Kearns Goodwin, Johnson claimed that Kennedy "acted like he was the custodian of the Kennedy dream" despite Johnson being seen as this after President Kennedy was assassinated; arguing that he had "waited" his turn and Kennedy should have done the same. Johnson recalled a "tidal wave of letters and memos about how great a vice president Bobby would be," but felt he could not "let it happen" as he viewed the possibility of Kennedy on the ticket as ensuring that he would never know if he could be elected "on my own." In July 1964, Johnson issued an official statement ruling out all of his current cabinet members as potential running mates, judging them to be "so valuable ... in their current posts." In response to this statement, angry letters poured in directed towards both Johnson and his wife, Lady Bird, expressing disappointment at Kennedy being dropped from the field of potential running mates.

==== Democratic National Convention ====
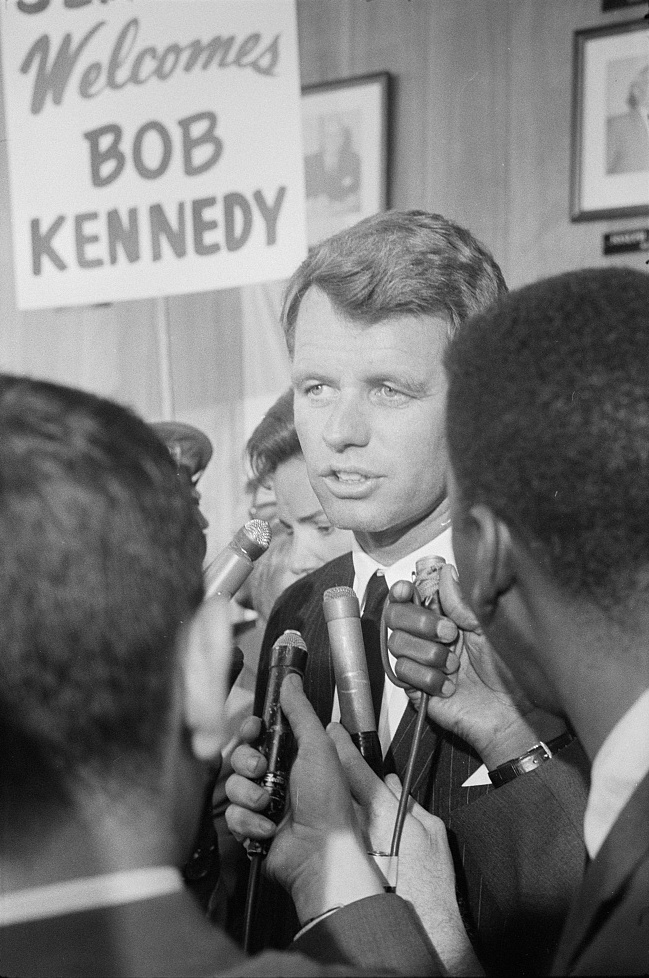
Kennedy at the 1964 Democratic National Convention

As the Democratic National Convention approached, Johnson feared that delegates, still swept with lingering emotion over the assassination of President Kennedy, might draft his brother onto the ticket as the vice-presidential nominee. Johnson ordered the FBI to monitor Kennedy's contacts and actions at the convention, and made sure that Kennedy did not speak until after Hubert Humphrey was confirmed as his running mate.

On the last day of the convention, Kennedy introduced a short film, A Thousand Days, in honor of his brother's memory. After Kennedy appeared on the convention floor, delegates erupted in 22 minutes of uninterrupted applause, causing him to nearly break into tears. Speaking about his brother's vision for the country, Kennedy quoted from Romeo and Juliet: "When he shall die, take him and cut him out into the stars, and he shall make the face of heaven so fine that all the world will be in love with night and pay no worship to the garish sun."

==== Kennedy's political future ====
In June 1964, Kennedy offered to succeed Henry Cabot Lodge Jr. as U.S. ambassador to South Vietnam. President Johnson rejected the idea. Kennedy considered leaving politics altogether after his brother, Ted Kennedy, suffered a broken back in the crash of a small plane near Southampton, Massachusetts, on June 19. Positive reception during a six-day trip to Germany and Poland convinced him to remain in politics.

In search of a way out of the dilemma, Kennedy asked speechwriter Milton Gwirtzman to write a memo comparing two offices: 1) governor of Massachusetts and 2) U.S. senator from New York, and "which would be a better place from which to make a run for the presidency in future years?" Biographer Shesol wrote that the Massachusetts governorship offered one important advantage: isolation from Lyndon Johnson. However, the state was hobbled by debt and an unruly legislature. Gwirtzman informed Kennedy that "you are going to receive invitations to attend dedications and speak around the country and abroad and to undertake other activities in connection with President Kennedy" and that "it would seem easier to do this as a U.S. senator based in Washington, D.C. than as a governor based in Boston."

== U.S. Senate (1965–1968) ==
=== 1964 election ===
On August 25, 1964, two days before the end of that year's Democratic National Convention, Kennedy announced his candidacy for the U.S. Senate representing New York. He resigned as attorney general on September 3. Kennedy could not run for the U.S. Senate from his native Massachusetts because his younger brother Ted was running for reelection in 1964. Despite their notoriously difficult relationship, President Johnson gave considerable support to Kennedy's campaign. The New York Times editorialized, "there is nothing illegal about the possible nomination of Robert F. Kennedy of Massachusetts as Senator from New York, but there is plenty of cynical about it, ... merely choosing the state as a convenient launching‐pad for the political ambitions of himself."

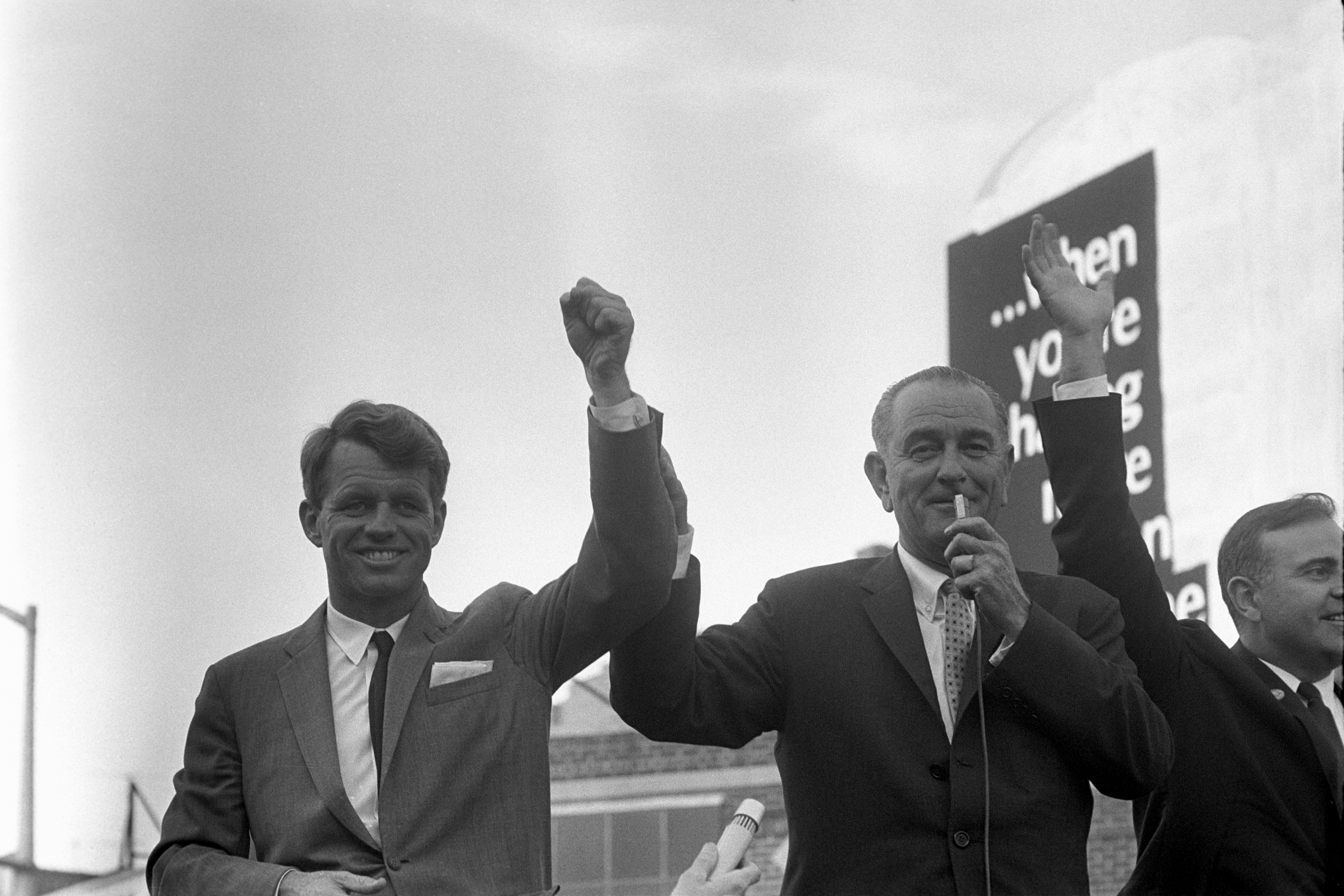
Kennedy (left) campaigning with President Lyndon Johnson, c. October 1964

His opponent, Republican incumbent Kenneth Keating, attempted to portray Kennedy as an arrogant "carpetbagger" since he did not reside in the state and was not registered to vote there. Kennedy was a legal resident of Massachusetts, and, under New York law, was not eligible to vote in the election. His wife Ethel made light of the criticism by suggesting this slogan: "There is only so much you can do for Massachusetts." Kennedy charged Keating with having "not done much of anything constructive" despite his presence in Congress during a September 8 press conference. During the campaign, Kennedy was frequently met by large crowds where he encountered multitudes of hecklers carrying signs that read: "BOBBY GO HOME!" and "GO BACK TO MASSACHUSETTS!". In the end, New York voters ignored the carpetbagging issue and Kennedy won the November election with a comfortable 700,000 vote margin, helped in part by Johnson's huge 2½ million vote victory margin in the state. With his victory, Robert and Ted Kennedy became the first brothers since Dwight and Theodore Foster to serve simultaneously in the U.S. Senate. Frequent appearances during this campaign period would help Kennedy refine his style, and he would give more than 300 speeches throughout his time in the Senate.

=== Tenure ===
Kennedy drew attention in Congress early on as the brother of President Kennedy, which set him apart from other senators. He drew more than 50 senators as spectators when he delivered a speech in the Senate on nuclear proliferation in June 1965. But he also saw a decline in his power, going from the president's most influential advisor to one of a hundred senators, and his impatience with collaborative lawmaking showed. Though fellow senator Fred R. Harris expected not to like Kennedy, the two became allies; Harris even called them "each other's best friends in the Senate". Kennedy's younger brother Ted was his senior there. Robert saw his brother as a guide on managing within the Senate, and the arrangement worked to deepen their relationship. Harris noted that Kennedy was intense about matters and issues that concerned him. Kennedy gained a reputation in the Senate for being well prepared for debate, but his tendency to speak to other senators in a more "blunt" fashion caused him to be "unpopular ... with many of his colleagues".

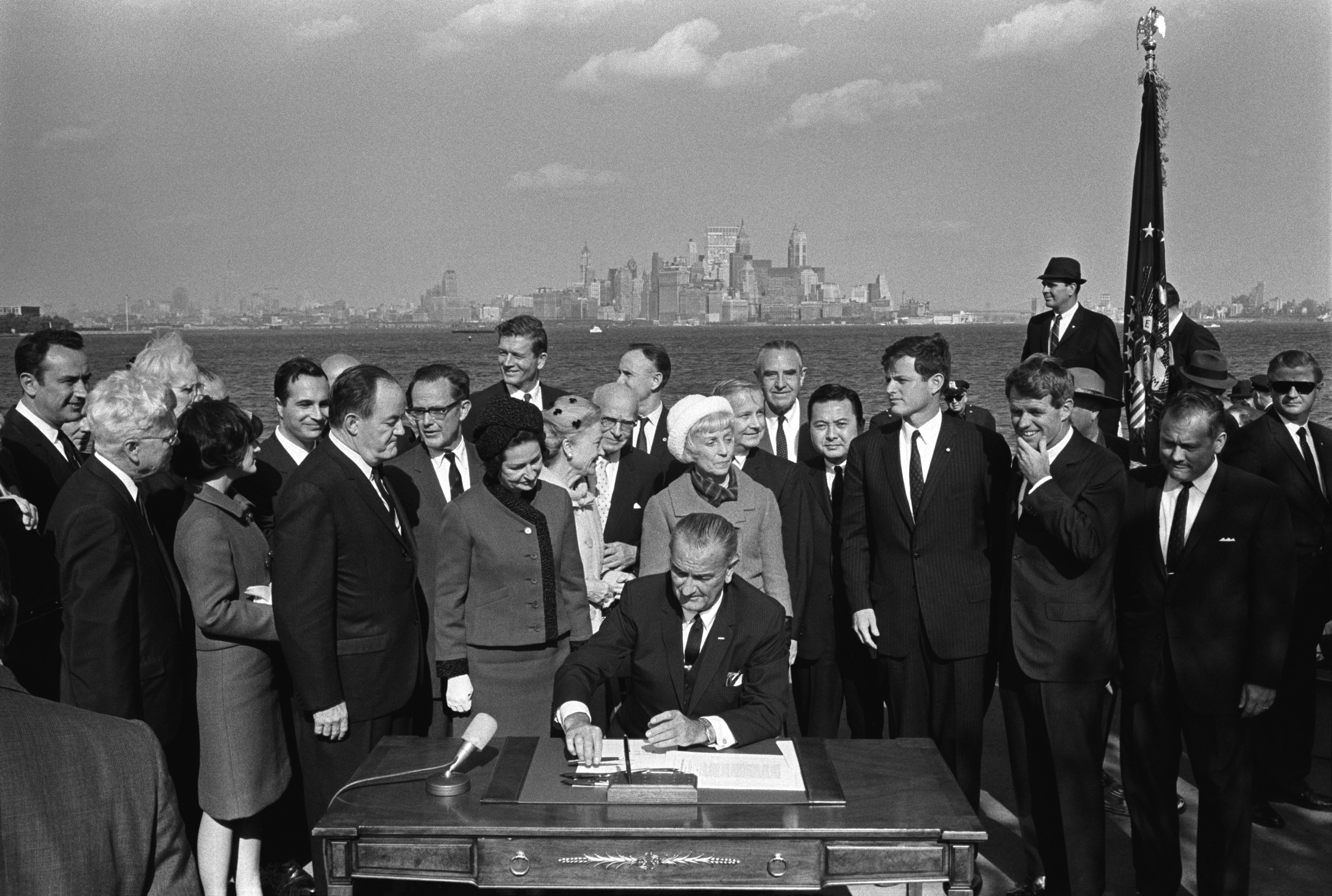
President Lyndon B. Johnson signs the Immigration and Nationality Act of 1965 as Ted and Robert Kennedy and others look on.

While serving in the Senate, Kennedy advocated gun control. In May 1965, he co-sponsored S.1592, proposed by President Johnson and sponsored by Senator Thomas J. Dodd, that would put federal restrictions on mail-order gun sales. Speaking in support of the bill, Kennedy said, "For too long we dealt with these deadly weapons as if they were harmless toys. Yet their very presence, the ease of their acquisition and the familiarity of their appearance have led to thousands of deaths each year. With the passage of this bill we will begin to meet our responsibilities. It would save hundreds of thousands of lives in this country and spare thousands of families ... grief and heartache." In remarks during a May 1968 campaign stop in Roseburg, Oregon, Kennedy defended the bill as keeping firearms away from "people who have no business with guns or rifles". The bill forbade "mail order sale of guns to the very young, those with criminal records and the insane", according to The Oregonian's report. S.1592 and subsequent bills, and the assassinations of Martin Luther King Jr. and Robert F. Kennedy himself, paved the way for the eventual passage of the Gun Control Act of 1968.

Kennedy and his staff had employed a cautionary "amendments–only" strategy for his first year in the Senate. He added an amendment to the Appalachian Regional Development Act to add 13 low-income New York counties situated along the Pennsylvania border. He succeeded in amending the Voting Rights Act of 1965 to protect U.S. educated non-English speakers (mainly Puerto Ricans in New York City) from unfair imposition of English-language literacy tests. Kennedy, concerned that federal funds would be misspent and not used to help disadvantaged children, delayed passage of the Elementary and Secondary Education Act until an evaluation clause was included. In 1966 and 1967 they took more direct legislative action, but were met with increasing resistance from the Johnson administration. Despite perceptions that the two were hostile in their respective offices to each other, U.S. News reported Kennedy's support of the Johnson administration's "Great Society" program through his voting record. Kennedy supported both major and minor parts of the program, and each year over 60% of his roll call votes were consistently in favor of Johnson's policies.

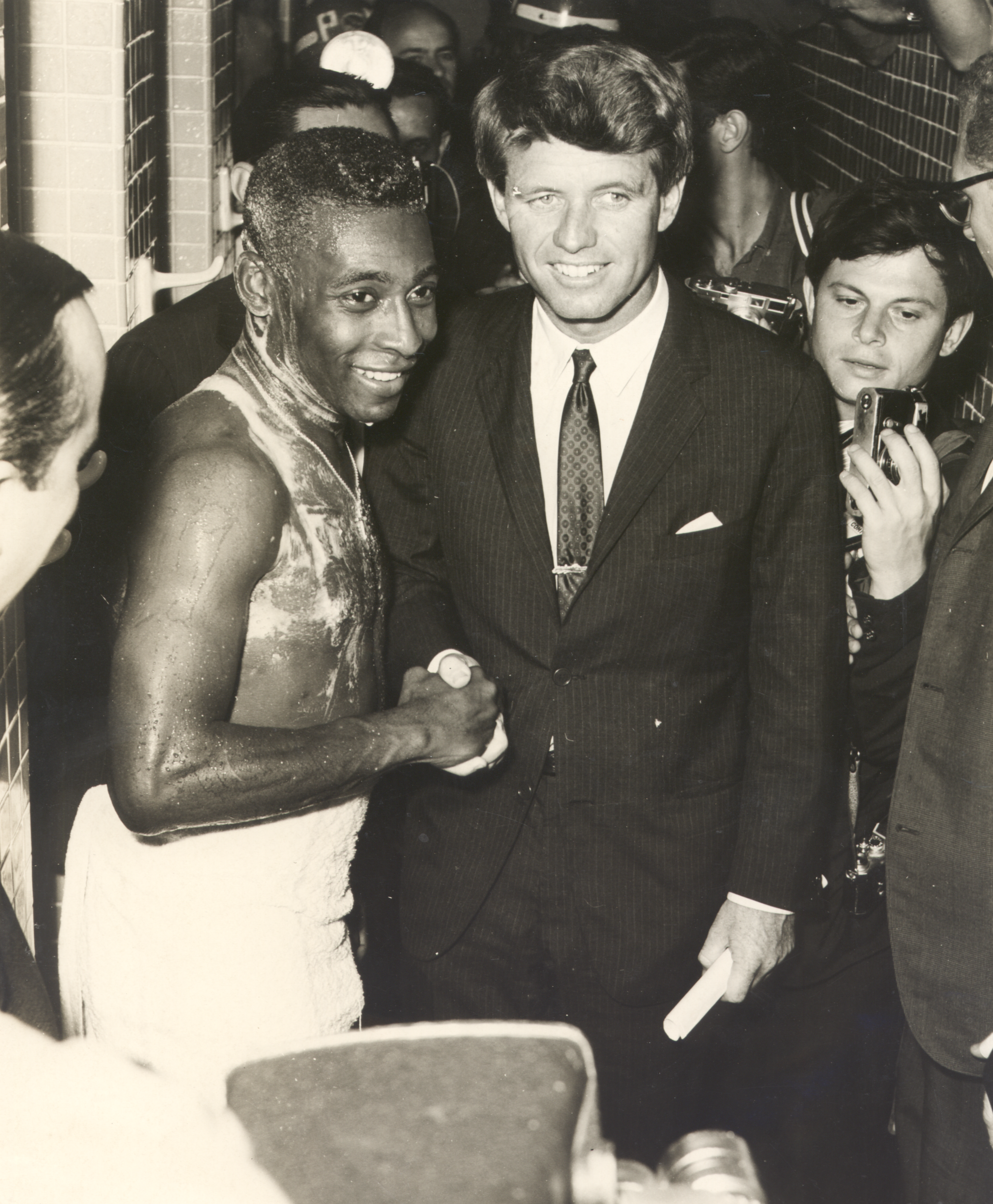
Pelé and Kennedy shaking hands after a game at Maracanã Stadium in Rio de Janeiro, c. November 1965

On February 8, 1966, Kennedy urged the United States to pledge that it would not be the first country to use nuclear weapons against countries that did not have them noting that China had made the pledge and the Soviet Union indicated it was also willing to do so.

Kennedy increased emphasis on human rights as a central focus of U.S. foreign policy. He criticized U.S. intervention in the Dominican Republic in 1965 and concluded that Johnson had abandoned the reform aims of President Kennedy's Alliance for Progress. He warned after a trip to Latin America in late 1965, "if we allow communism to carry the banner of reform, then the ignored and the dispossessed, the insulted and injured, will turn to it as the only way out of their misery." In June 1966, he visited apartheid-era South Africa accompanied by his wife, Ethel, and a few aides. The tour was greeted with international praise at a time when few politicians dared to entangle themselves in the politics of South Africa. Kennedy spoke out against the oppression of the native population and was welcomed by the black population as though he were a visiting head of state. In an interview with Look magazine he said:

At the University of Natal in Durban, I was told the church to which most of the white population belongs teaches apartheid as a moral necessity. A questioner declared that few churches allow black Africans to pray with the white because the Bible says that is the way it should be, because God created Negroes to serve. "But suppose God is black", I replied. "What if we go to Heaven and we, all our lives, have treated the Negro as an inferior, and God is there, and we look up and He is not white? What then is our response?" There was no answer. Only silence.

At the University of Cape Town he delivered the annual Day of Affirmation Address. A quote from this address appears on his memorial at Arlington National Cemetery: "Each time a man stands up for an ideal, or acts to improve the lot of others, or strikes out against injustice, he sends forth a tiny ripple of hope." South Africa was considered in the United States to be an anti-communist ally, a position he critiqued, asking "What does it mean to be against communism if one's own system denies the value of the individual and gives all the power to the government—just as the Communists do?".

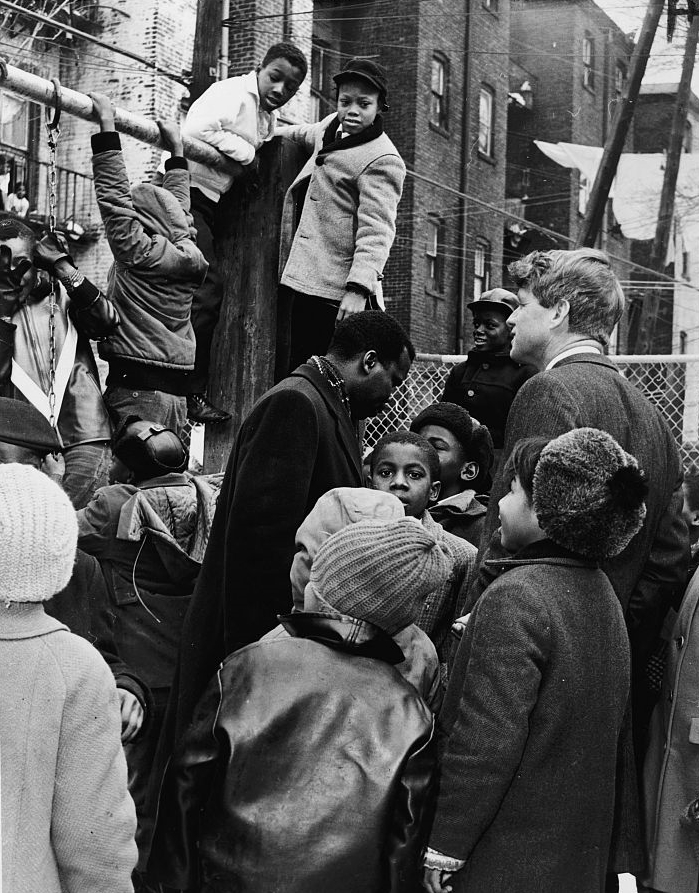
Kennedy (right) speaks with children while touring Bedford–Stuyvesant in Brooklyn, c. February 1966.

In 1966, Kennedy sponsored an amendment to the Economic Opportunity Act of 1964 that created the Special Impact Program (SIP). Kennedy saw SIP as differing from the earlier War on Poverty programs in its strong focus on specific distressed communities and its emphasis on economic development as a way to alleviate poverty. To demonstrate these principles, Kennedy and his staff created the Bedford Stuyvesant Restoration Corporation (BSRC) in Brooklyn, the first community development corporation in the country. BSRC developed affordable housing, started a job-training program, and convinced IBM to locate a major plant in its neighborhood that would employ over 400 individuals.

As Senator, Kennedy's attention focused on the marginalized and dispossessed. In April 1967, Kennedy, as part of the Senate Subcommittee on Employment, Manpower, and Poverty, made a fact-finding tour of the Mississippi Delta, where circumstances stunned him as he saw children starving in substandard housing. Kennedy asked NAACP attorney Marian Wright Edelman to call on Martin Luther King Jr. to bring the impoverished to Washington, D.C., to make them more visible, leading to the creation of the Poor People's Campaign. He also learned about Cesar Chavez and the National Farm Workers Association's (NFWA) movement to earn a living wage and improve employment conditions. In March 1966, the Senate Subcommittee on Migratory Labor held hearings in Delano, California. When the local sheriff told Kennedy that his deputies arrested strikers who looked "ready to violate the law," Kennedy shot back, "May I suggest that during the luncheon, the sheriff and the district attorney read the Constitution of the United States?" Kennedy deplored the poverty on Native American reservations, and had the Senate create a Special Subcommittee on Indian Education with him as chairman. In 1964, the Johnson administration made Appalachia its unofficial ground zero for the war on poverty. When Senator Kennedy toured eastern Kentucky in February 1968, he found conditions "intolerable, unacceptable, and unsatisfactory" and judged the federal antipoverty effort a dismal failure.

Kennedy sought to remedy the problems of poverty by introducing two highly complex bills in 1967. The first bill, the Urban and Rural Employment Opportunities Development Act, provided, among other initiatives, tax incentives for private industry to invest in poverty areas based on provisions similar to those of the Foreign Investment Credit Act, which was designed to fuel American investment in underdeveloped countries. The second bill, the Urban Housing Development Act, furnished benefits including tax credits and low-interest loans to firms which agreed to construct low-rent housing in poverty areas under specific conditions, stipulating that they employ workers from the local community. The Senate Finance Committee did not approve either bill, in part because of opposition from President Johnson. According to Kennedy, government welfare and housing programs ignored the unemployment and social disorganization that caused people to seek public assistance in the first place, and often become bogged down in bureaucracy and lack flexibility.

==== Vietnam ====
The Kennedy administration backed U.S. involvement in Southeast Asia and other parts of the world in the frame of the Cold War, but Robert was not known to be involved in discussions on the Vietnam War as his brother's attorney general. Entering the Senate, Kennedy initially kept private his disagreements with President Johnson on the war. While Kennedy vigorously supported his brother's earlier efforts, he never publicly advocated commitment of ground troops. Though bothered by the beginning of the bombing of North Vietnam in February 1965, Kennedy did not wish to appear antagonistic toward the president's agenda. But by April, Kennedy was advocating a halt to the bombing to Johnson, who acknowledged that Kennedy played a part in influencing his choice to temporarily cease bombing the following month. Kennedy cautioned Johnson against sending combat troops as early as 1965, but Johnson chose instead to follow the recommendation of the rest of his predecessor's still intact staff of advisers. In July, after Johnson made a large commitment of American ground forces to Vietnam, Kennedy made multiple calls for a settlement through negotiation. In a letter to Kennedy the following month, John Paul Vann, a lieutenant colonel in the U.S. Army, wrote that Kennedy "indicat[ed] comprehension of the problems we face". In December 1965, Kennedy advised his friend, the Defense Secretary Robert McNamara, that he should counsel Johnson to declare a ceasefire in Vietnam, a bombing pause over North Vietnam, and to take up an offer by Algeria to serve as an "honest broker" in peace talks. The left-wing Algerian government had friendly relations with North Vietnam and the National Liberation Front and had indicated in 1965–1966 that it was willing to serve as a conduit for peace talks, but most of Johnson's advisers were leery of the Algerian offer.

On January 31, 1966, Kennedy said in a speech on the Senate floor: "If we regard bombing as the answer in Vietnam, we are headed straight for disaster." In February 1966, Kennedy released a peace plan that called for preserving South Vietnam while at the same time allowing the National Liberation Front, better known as the Viet Cong, to join a coalition government in Saigon. When asked by reporters if he was speaking on behalf of Johnson, Kennedy replied: "I don't think anyone has ever suggested that I was speaking for the White House." Kennedy's peace plan made front-page news with The New York Times calling it a break with the president while the Chicago Tribunal labelled him in an editorial "Ho Chi Kennedy". Vice President Humphrey on a visit to New Zealand said that Kennedy's "peace recipe" included "a dose of arsenic" while the National Security Adviser McGeorge Bundy quoted to the press Kennedy's remarks from 1963 saying he was against including Communists in coalition governments (though Kennedy's subject was Germany, not Vietnam). Kennedy was displeased when he heard anti-war protesters chanting his name, saying "I'm not Wayne Morse." To put aside reports of a rift with Johnson, Kennedy flew with Johnson on Air Force One on a trip to New York on February 23, 1966, and barely clapped his hands in approval when Johnson denied waging a war of conquest in Vietnam. In an interview with the Today program, Kennedy conceded that his views on Vietnam were "a little confusing."

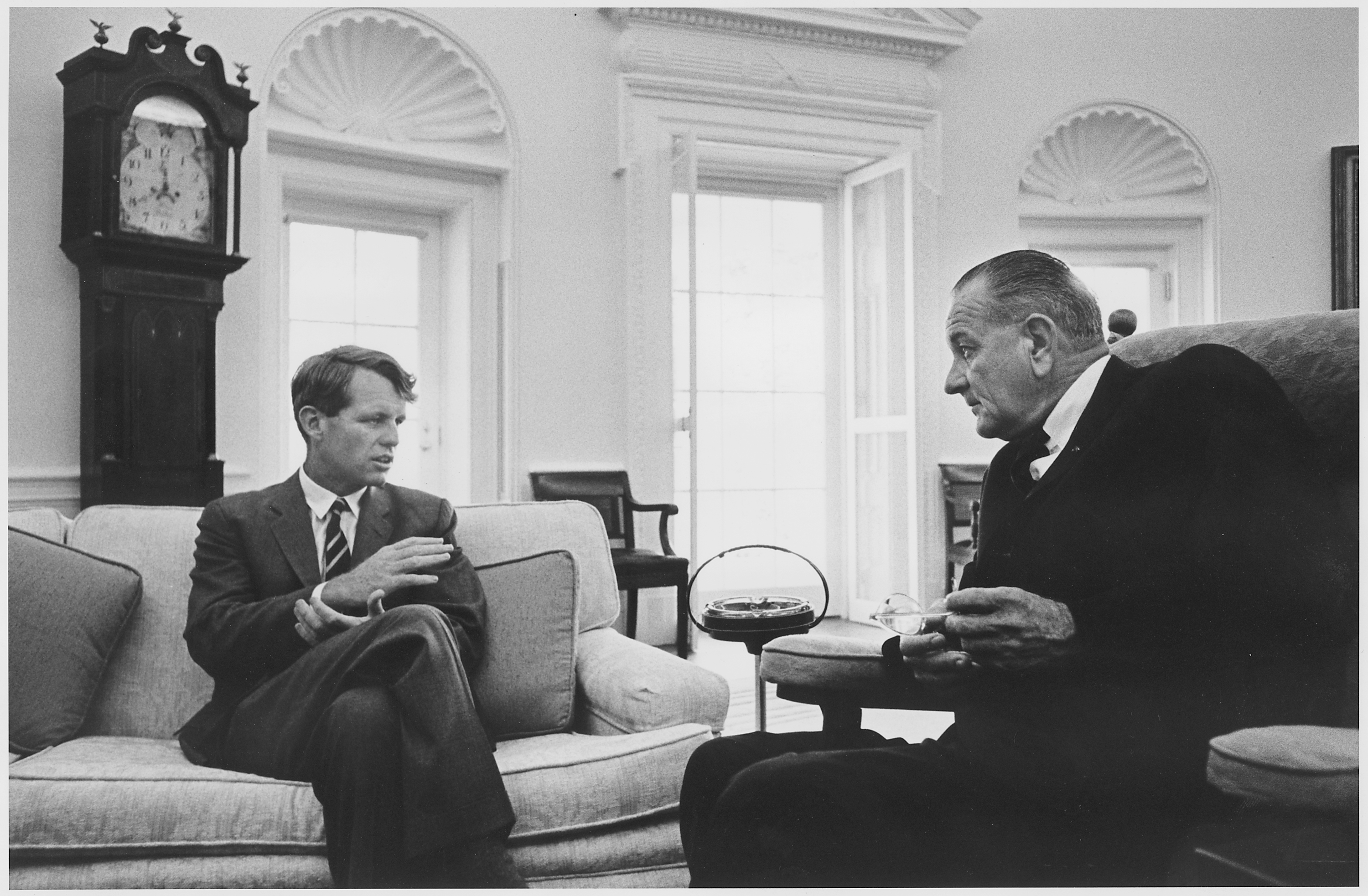
Senator Kennedy and President Johnson in the Oval Office, c. June 1966

In April 1966, Kennedy had a private meeting with Philip Heymann of the State Department's Bureau of Security and Consular Affairs to discuss efforts to secure the release of American prisoners of war in Vietnam. Kennedy wanted to press the Johnson administration to do more, but Heymann insisted that the administration believed the "consequences of sitting down with the Viet Cong" mattered more than the prisoners they were holding captive. On June 29, Kennedy released a statement disavowing President Johnson's choice to bomb Haiphong, but he avoided criticizing either the war or the president's overall foreign policy, believing that it might harm Democratic candidates in the 1966 midterm elections. In August, the International Herald Tribune described Kennedy's popularity as outpacing President Johnson's, crediting Kennedy's attempts to end the Vietnam conflict which the public increasingly desired.

In early 1967, Kennedy traveled to Europe, where he had discussions about Vietnam with leaders and diplomats. A story leaked to the State Department that Kennedy was talking about seeking peace while President Johnson was pursuing the war. Johnson became convinced that Kennedy was undermining his authority. He voiced this during a meeting with Kennedy, who reiterated the interest of the European leaders to pause the bombing while going forward with negotiations; Johnson declined to do so. On March 2, Kennedy outlined a three-point plan to end the war which included suspending the U.S. bombing of North Vietnam, and the eventual withdrawal of American and North Vietnamese soldiers from South Vietnam; this plan was rejected by Secretary of State Dean Rusk, who believed North Vietnam would never agree to it. On November 26, during an appearance on Face the Nation, Kennedy asserted that the Johnson administration had deviated from his brother's policies in Vietnam, his first time contrasting the two administrations' policies on the war. He added that the view that Americans were fighting to end communism in Vietnam was "immoral".

On February 8, 1968, Kennedy delivered an address in Chicago, where he critiqued Saigon "government corruption" and expressed his disagreement with the Johnson administration's stance that the war would determine the future of Asia. On March 14, Kennedy met with defense secretary Clark Clifford at the Pentagon regarding the war. Clifford's notes indicate that Kennedy was offering not to enter the ongoing Democratic presidential primaries if President Johnson would admit publicly to having been wrong in his Vietnam policy and appoint "a group of persons to conduct a study in depth of the issues and come up with a recommended course of action"; Johnson rejected the proposal. On April 1, after President Johnson halted bombing of North Vietnam, Kennedy said the decision was a "step toward peace" and, though offering to collaborate with Johnson for national unity, opted to continue his presidential bid. On May 1, while campaigning in Indiana, Kennedy said continued delays in beginning peace talks with North Vietnam meant both more lives lost and the postponing of the "domestic progress" hoped for by the U.S. Later that month, Kennedy called the war "the gravest kind of error" during a speech in Oregon. In an interview on June 4, hours before he was shot, Kennedy continued to advocate for a change in policy towards the war.

== 1968 presidential campaign ==
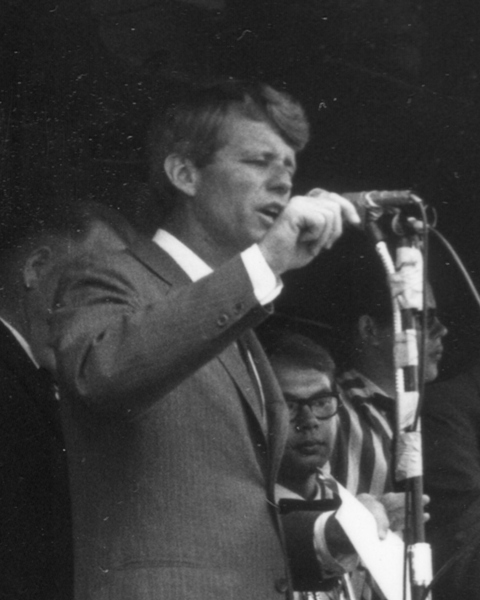
Tired but still intense in the days leading up to his defeat in the Oregon primary, Robert Kennedy speaks from the platform of a campaign train, c. May 1968.

In 1968, President Johnson prepared to run for reelection. In January, faced with what was widely considered an unrealistic race against an incumbent president, Kennedy said he would not seek the presidency. After the Tet Offensive in Vietnam in early February, he received a letter from writer Pete Hamill that said poor people kept pictures of President Kennedy on their walls and that Kennedy had an "obligation of staying true to whatever it was that put those pictures on those walls". There were other factors that influenced Kennedy's decision to seek the presidency. On February 29, the Kerner Commission issued a report on the racial unrest that had affected American cities during the previous summer. The report blamed "white racism" for the violence, but its findings were largely dismissed by the Johnson administration. Kennedy indicated that Johnson's apparent disinterest in the commission's conclusions meant that "he's not going to do anything about the cities." However, a phone conversation between President Johnson and Chicago mayor Richard J. Daley on January 27, 1968, revealed that Daley had knowledge of Kennedy's intentions to run for president by that time, with Daley telling Johnson that Kennedy met with him and sought his support, which he declined. Daley and Johnson also noted how they were trying to feed to Kennedy's ego and make him think that his pending presidential run was a "revolution" for the Democratic Party.

Kennedy traveled to Delano, California, to meet with civil rights activist César Chávez, who was on a 25-day hunger strike showing his commitment to nonviolence. It was on this visit to California that Kennedy stated he would challenge Johnson for the presidency, telling his former Justice Department aides, Edwin Guthman and Peter Edelman, that his first step was to get lesser-known U.S. Senator Eugene McCarthy to drop out of the presidential race. His younger brother Ted Kennedy was the leading voice against a bid for the presidency. He felt that his brother ought to wait until 1972, after Johnson's tenure was finished. If Robert ran in 1968 and lost in the primaries to a sitting president, Ted felt that it would destroy his brother's chances later. Johnson won a narrow victory in the New Hampshire primary on March 12, against McCarthy 49–42%, but this close second-place result dramatically boosted McCarthy's standing in the race.

After much speculation, and reports leaking out about his plans, and seeing in McCarthy's success that Johnson's hold on the job was not as strong as originally thought, Kennedy publicly declared his candidacy on March 16, in the Caucus Room of the Russell Senate Office Building, the same room where his brother John had declared his own candidacy eight years earlier. He said, "I do not run for the presidency merely to oppose any man, but to propose new policies. I run because I am convinced that this country is on a perilous course and because I have such strong feelings about what must be done, and I feel that I'm obliged to do all I can."

McCarthy supporters angrily denounced Kennedy as an opportunist. Kennedy's announcement split the anti-war movement in two. On March 31, Johnson stunned the nation by dropping out of the race. Vice President Hubert Humphrey entered the race on April 27 with the financial backing and critical endorsement of the party "establishment", which gave him a better chance at gaining convention delegates from non-primary party caucuses and state conventions. With state registration deadlines long past, Humphrey joined the race too late to enter any primaries but had the support of the president. Kennedy, like his brother before him, planned to win the nomination through popular support in the primaries.

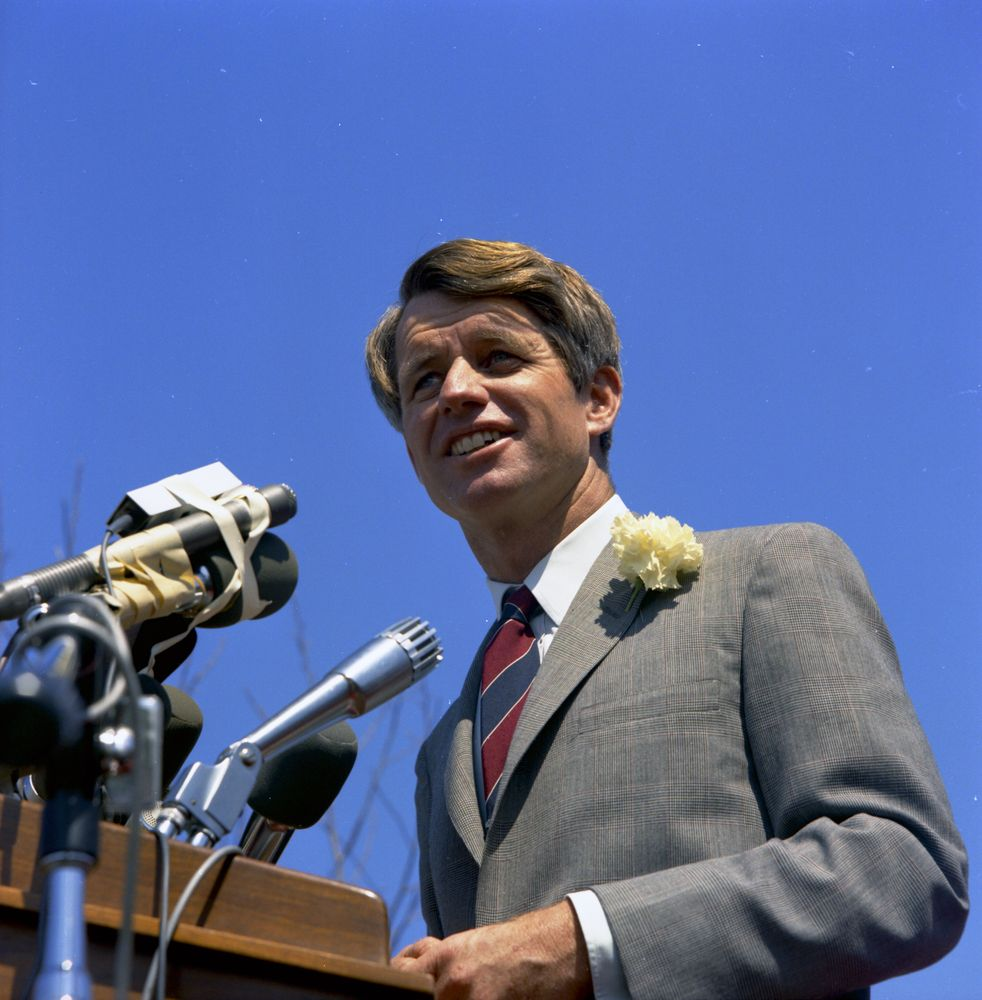
Kennedy campaigning in Los Angeles (photo courtesy of John F. Kennedy Presidential Library and Museum, Boston)

Kennedy ran on a platform of racial equality, economic justice, non-aggression in foreign policy, decentralization of power, and social improvement. A crucial element of his campaign was youth engagement. "You are the people," Kennedy said, "who have the least ties to the present and the greatest stake in the future." During a speech at the University of Kansas on March 18, Kennedy notably outlined why he thought the gross national product (GNP) was an insufficient measure of success, emphasizing the negative values it accounted for and the positive ones it ignored. According to Schlesinger, Kennedy's presidential campaign generated "wild enthusiasm" as well as deep anger. He visited numerous small towns and made himself available to the masses by participating in long motorcades and street-corner stump speeches, often in inner cities. Kennedy's candidacy faced opposition from Southern Democrats, leaders of organized labor, and the business community. At one of his university speeches (Indiana University Medical School), he was asked, "Where are we going to get the money to pay for all these new programs you're proposing?" He replied to the medical students, about to enter lucrative careers, "From you."

On April 4, Kennedy learned of the assassination of Martin Luther King Jr. and gave a heartfelt impromptu speech in Indianapolis's inner city, calling for a reconciliation between the races. The address was the first time Kennedy spoke publicly about his brother's killing. Riots broke out in 60 cities in the wake of King's death, but not in Indianapolis, a fact many attribute to the effect of this speech. Kennedy addressed the City Club of Cleveland the following day; delivering the famous "On the Mindless Menace of Violence" speech. He attended King's funeral, accompanied by Jacqueline and Ted Kennedy. He was described as being the "only white politician to hear only cheers and applause".

Kennedy won the Indiana primary on May 7 with 42 percent of the vote, and the Nebraska primary on May 14 with 52 percent of the vote. On May 28, Kennedy lost the Oregon primary, marking the first time a Kennedy lost an election, and it was assumed that McCarthy was the preferred choice among the young voters. If he could defeat McCarthy in the California primary, the leadership of the campaign thought, he would knock McCarthy out of the race and set up a one-on-one against Vice President Humphrey at the Democratic National Convention in August.

== Assassination ==
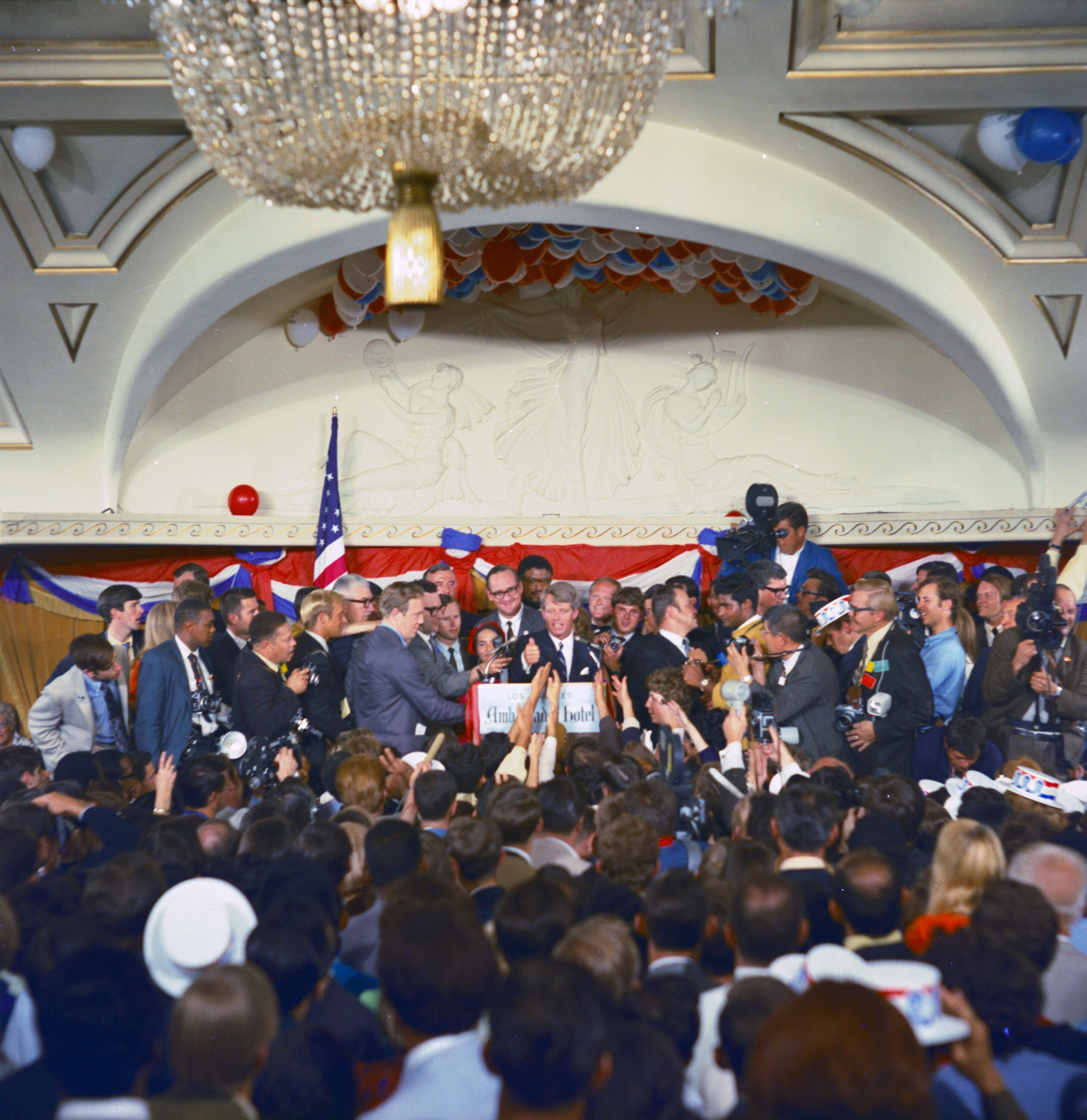
Kennedy delivers remarks to a crowd at the Ambassador Hotel in Los Angeles moments before his assassination, c. June 5, 1968

Kennedy scored major victories when he won both the California and South Dakota primaries on June 4. He was now in second place with 393 total delegates, against Humphrey's 561 delegates. Kennedy addressed his supporters shortly after midnight on June 5, in a ballroom at the Ambassador Hotel in Los Angeles. At approximately 12:10 a.m., concluding his speech, Kennedy said: "My thanks to all of you and it's on to Chicago and let's win there." Leaving the ballroom, he went through the hotel kitchen after being told it was a shortcut to a press room. He did this despite being advised by his bodyguard—former FBI agent Bill Barry—to avoid the kitchen. In a crowded kitchen passageway, Kennedy turned to his left and shook hands with hotel busboy Juan Romero just as Sirhan Sirhan, a 24-year-old Palestinian, opened fire with a .22-caliber revolver. Kennedy was hit three times, and five other people were wounded.

George Plimpton, former decathlete Rafer Johnson, and former professional football player Rosey Grier are credited with wrestling Sirhan to the ground after he shot the senator. As Kennedy lay mortally wounded, Romero cradled his head and placed a rosary in his hand. Kennedy asked Romero, "Is everybody OK?", and Romero responded, "Yes, everybody's OK." Kennedy then turned away from Romero and said, "Everything's going to be OK." After several minutes, medical attendants arrived and lifted the senator onto a stretcher, prompting him to whisper, "Don't lift me", which were his last words. He lost consciousness shortly thereafter. He was rushed first to Los Angeles' Central Receiving Hospital, less than 2 miles (3.2 km) east of the Ambassador Hotel, and then to the adjoining (one city block distant) Good Samaritan Hospital. Despite extensive neurosurgery to remove the bullet and bone fragments from his brain, Kennedy was pronounced dead at 1:44 a.m. (PDT) on June 6, nearly 26 hours after the shooting. Kennedy's death, like the 1963 assassination of his brother John, has been the subject of conspiracy theories.

=== Funeral ===
Kennedy's body was returned to Manhattan, where it lay in repose at Saint Patrick's Cathedral from approximately 10:00 p.m. until 10:00 a.m. on June 8. A high requiem Mass was held at the cathedral at 10:00 a.m. on June 8. The service was attended by members of the extended Kennedy family, President Johnson and his wife Lady Bird Johnson, and members of the Johnson cabinet. Ted, the only surviving Kennedy brother, said the following:

My brother need not be idealized, or enlarged in death beyond what he was in life; to be remembered simply as a good and decent man, who saw wrong and tried to right it, saw suffering and tried to heal it, saw war and tried to stop it. Those of us who loved him and who take him to his rest today, pray that what he was to us and what he wished for others will some day come to pass for all the world. As he said many times, in many parts of this nation, to those he touched and who sought to touch him: "Some men see things as they are and say why. I dream things that never were and say why not."

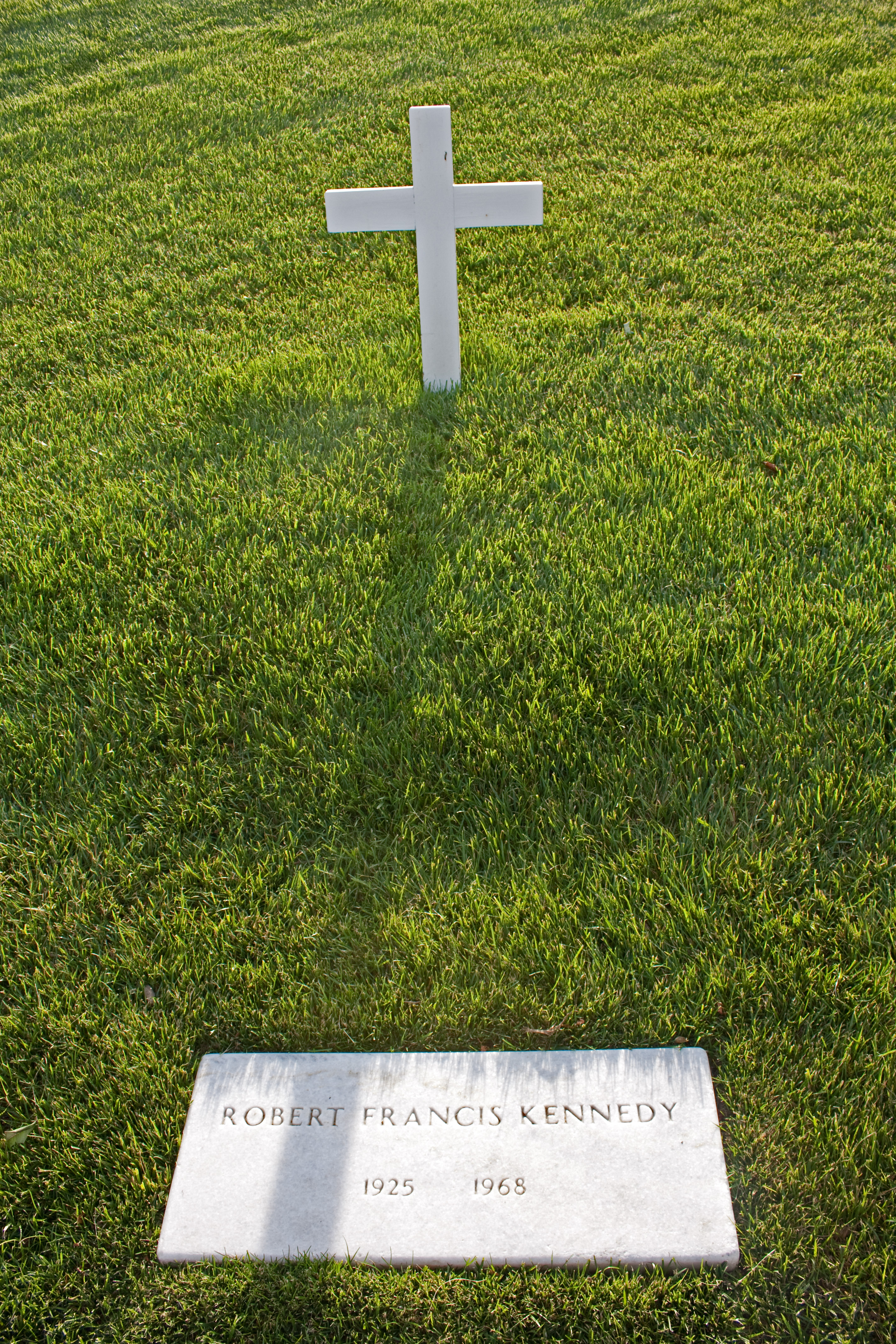
Kennedy's gravesite in Arlington National Cemetery, prior to his wife Ethel Kennedy's death in 2024

The requiem Mass concluded with the hymn "The Battle Hymn of the Republic", sung by Andy Williams. Immediately following the Mass, Kennedy's body was transported by a special private train to Washington, D.C. Kennedy's funeral train was pulled by two Penn Central GG1 electric locomotives. Thousands of mourners lined the tracks and stations along the route, paying their respects as the train passed. The train departed New York Penn Station at 12:30 pm. When it arrived in Elizabeth, New Jersey, an eastbound train on a parallel track to the funeral train hit and killed two spectators and seriously injured four, after they were unable to get off the track in time, even though the eastbound train's engineer had slowed to 30 mph for the normally 55 mph curve, blown his horn continuously, and rung his bell through the curve. The normally four-hour trip took more than eight hours because of the thick crowds lining the tracks on the 225-mile (362 km) journey. The train was scheduled to arrive at about 4:30 pm, but sticking brakes on the casket-bearing car contributed to delays, and the train finally arrived at Washington, D.C.'s Union Station at 9:10 p.m. on June 8.

=== Burial ===
Kennedy was buried close to his brother John at Arlington National Cemetery in Arlington, Virginia, just across the Potomac River from Washington, D.C. Although he had always maintained that he wished to be buried in Massachusetts, his family believed Robert should be interred in Arlington next to his brother. The procession left Union Station and passed the New Senate Office Building, where he had his offices, and then proceeded to the Lincoln Memorial, where it paused. The Marine Corps Band played "The Battle Hymn of the Republic". The funeral motorcade arrived at the cemetery at 10:24 p.m. As the vehicles entered the cemetery, people lining the roadway spontaneously lit candles to guide the motorcade to the burial site.

The 15-minute ceremony began at 10:30 p.m. Cardinal Patrick O'Boyle, Roman Catholic Archbishop of Washington, officiated at the graveside service in lieu of Cardinal Richard Cushing, Archbishop of Boston, who fell ill during the trip. Also officiating was Terence Cooke, Archbishop of New York. On behalf of the United States, John Glenn presented the folded flag to Ted Kennedy, who passed it to Robert's eldest son, Joe, who passed it to Ethel Kennedy. The Navy Band played "The Navy Hymn".

Officials at Arlington National Cemetery said that Kennedy's burial was the only night burial to have taken place at the cemetery. (The re-interment of Patrick Bouvier Kennedy, who died two days after his birth in August 1963, and a stillborn daughter, Arabella, both children of President Kennedy and his wife, Jacqueline, also occurred at night.) After the president was interred in Arlington Cemetery, the two infants were buried next to him on December 5, 1963, in a private ceremony without publicity. His brother, Senator Edward M. Kennedy, was also buried at night, in 2009.

On June 9, President Johnson assigned security staff to all U.S. presidential candidates and declared an official national day of mourning. After the assassination, the mandate of the U.S. Secret Service was altered by Congress to include the protection of U.S. presidential candidates.

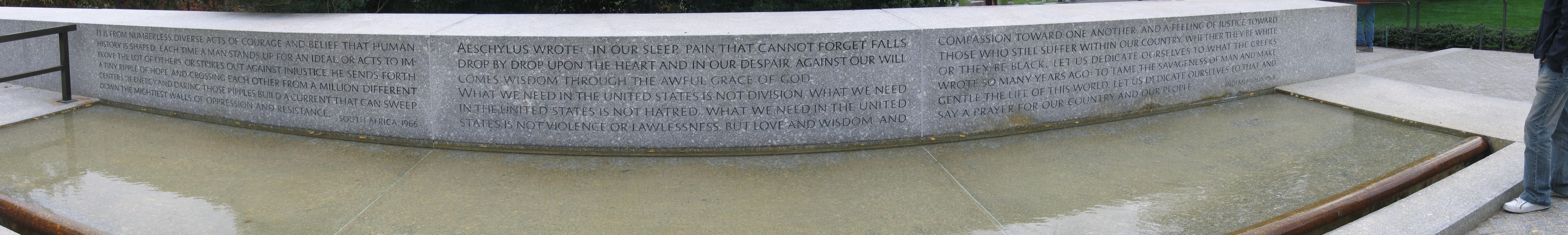
The Robert F. Kennedy Memorial, built in 1971, across from his gravesite at Arlington National Cemetery

== Personal life ==
=== Wife and children ===
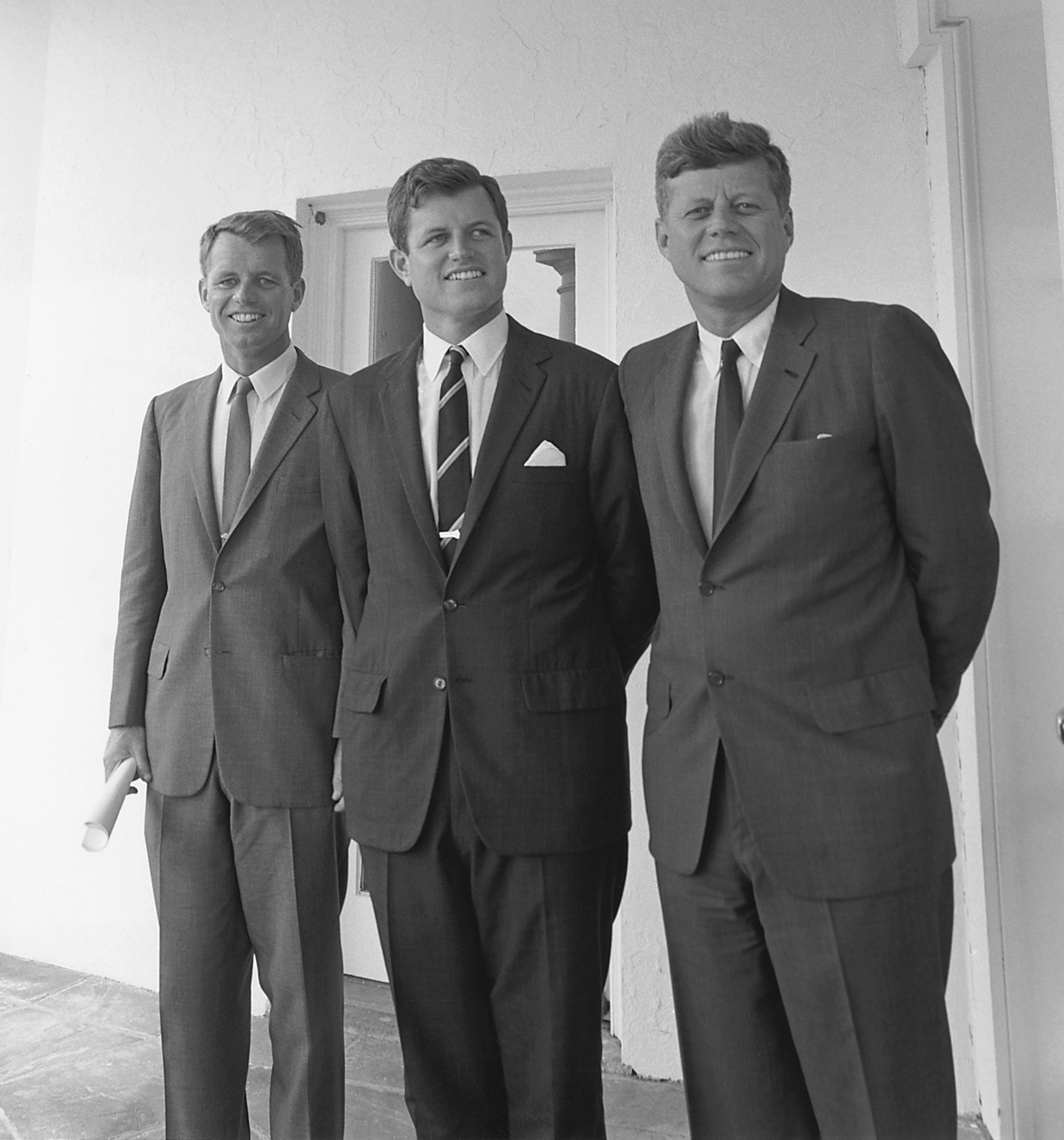
The Kennedy brothers from left to right: Robert, Ted, and John at the White House, August 1963

On June 17, 1950, Kennedy married Ethel Skakel at St. Mary's Catholic Church in Greenwich, Connecticut. They first met during a skiing trip to Mont Tremblant Resort in Quebec, Canada in December 1945. The couple had 11 children: Kathleen in 1951, Joseph in 1952, Robert Jr. in 1954, David in 1955, Mary Courtney in 1956, Michael in 1958, Mary Kerry in 1959, Christopher in 1963, Maxwell in 1965, Douglas in 1967, and Rory in 1968.

As a law student, Kennedy listed his legal residency in the Beacon Hill section of Boston, across from the Massachusetts State House. After law school, Kennedy and his wife Ethel lived in a townhouse in Georgetown, Washington, D.C. In 1956, the Kennedys purchased Hickory Hill, a six-acre estate in McLean, Virginia, from Robert's brother John. Robert and Ethel held many gatherings at Hickory Hill and were known for their impressive and eclectic guest lists.

The couple also owned a home in Hyannis Port, Massachusetts on Cape Cod, their legal residence until 1964. When he began preparations to run for the U.S. Senate from New York, Kennedy rented a Colonial home in Glen Cove, Long Island. In 1965, he purchased an apartment at United Nations Plaza in Manhattan.

=== Attitudes and approach ===
Kennedy's opponents on Capitol Hill maintained that his collegiate magnanimity was sometimes hindered by a tenacious and somewhat impatient manner. His professional life was dominated by the same attitudes that governed his family life: a certainty that good humor and leisure must be balanced by service and accomplishment. Schlesinger comments that Kennedy could be both the most ruthlessly diligent and yet generously adaptable of politicians, at once both temperamental and forgiving. In this, he was very much his father's son, lacking truly lasting emotional independence, and yet possessing a great desire to contribute. He lacked the innate self-confidence of his contemporaries, yet found a greater self-assurance in the experience of married life; an experience he said had given him a base of self-belief from which to continue his efforts in the public arena.

Kennedy confessed to possessing a bad temper that required self-control: "My biggest problem as counsel is to keep my temper. I think we all feel that when a witness comes before the United States Senate, he has an obligation to speak frankly and tell the truth. To see people sit in front of us and lie and evade makes me boil inside. But you can't lose your temper; if you do, the witness has gotten the best of you."

Attorney Michael O'Donnell wrote, "[Kennedy] offered that most intoxicating of political aphrodisiacs: authenticity. He was blunt to a fault, and his favorite campaign activity was arguing with college students. To many, his idealistic opportunism was irresistible."

In his earlier life, Kennedy had developed a reputation as the family's attack dog. He was a hostile cross-examiner on Joseph McCarthy's Senate committee; a fixer and leg-breaker as JFK's campaign manager; an unforgiving and merciless cutthroat—his father's son right down to Joseph Kennedy's purported observation that "he hates like me." Yet Bobby Kennedy somehow became a liberal icon, an antiwar visionary who tried to outflank Lyndon Johnson's Great Society from the left.

On Kennedy's ideological development, his brother John once remarked, "He might once have been intolerant of liberals as such because his early experience was with that high-minded, high-speaking kind who never got anything done. That all changed the moment he met a liberal like Walter Reuther." Evan Thomas noted that although Kennedy embraced the counterculture movement to some extent, he remained true to his Catholic outlook and censorious moralism.

=== Relationship with family members ===
Kennedy's mother Rose found his gentle personality endearing, but this made him "invisible to his father." She influenced him heavily and, like her, Robert became a devout Catholic, practicing his faith more seriously than his siblings over his lifetime. Joe Sr. was satisfied with Kennedy as an adult, believing him to have become "hard as nails", more like him than any of the other children, while his mother believed he exemplified all she had wanted in a child.

In October 1951, Kennedy embarked on a seven-week Asian trip with his brother John (then a U.S. congressman from Massachusetts' 11th district) and their sister Patricia, traveling to Israel, India, Pakistan, Vietnam, and Japan. Because of their age gap, the two brothers had previously seen little of each other—this 25,000-mile (40,000 km) trip came at their father's behest, and was the first extended time they had spent together, serving to deepen their relationship. On this trip, the brothers met Liaquat Ali Khan just before his assassination and India's prime minister, Jawaharlal Nehru.

=== Religious faith and Greek philosophy ===
Throughout his life, Kennedy made reference to his faith, how it informed every area of his life, and how it gave him the strength to reenter politics after his brother's assassination. Historian Evan Thomas calls Kennedy a "romantic Catholic who believed that it was possible to create the Kingdom of Heaven on earth." Journalist Murray Kempton wrote about Kennedy: "His was not an unresponsive and staid faith, but the faith of a Catholic Radical, perhaps the first successful Catholic Radical in American political history." Kennedy was deeply shaken by anti-Catholicism he encountered during his brother's presidential campaign in 1960, especially that of Protestant intellectuals and journalists. That year, Kennedy said, "Anti-Catholicism is the anti-semitism of the intellectuals."

At his household, Kennedy and his family prayed before meals and before bed, and had every bedroom of his children outfitted with a Bible, a statue of the Virgin Mary, a crucifix and holy water. During their visit to the Vatican in 1962, Pope John XXIII gave Robert and Ethel medals of his Pontificate and rosaries for themselves and each of their seven children. Kennedy also pressured the Catholic hierarchy to move toward religious liberalism. In 1966, he visited Pope Paul VI and urged him to address the misery and poverty of South Africa's black population. In 1967, he asked Paul to adopt more liberal rhetoric and extend the Church's appeal to Hispanics and other nationalities.

In the last years of his life, Kennedy also found solace in the playwrights and poets of Ancient Greece, especially Aeschylus, suggested to him by Jacqueline after John's death. In his Indianapolis speech on April 4, 1968, following the assassination of Martin Luther King Jr., Kennedy quoted these lines from Aeschylus:

Even in our sleep, pain which cannot forget falls drop by drop upon the heart, until, in our own despair, against our will, comes wisdom through the awful grace of God.

=== Use and advocacy of psychedelics ===
Kennedy has been reported to have taken psychedelic drugs such as LSD or psilocybin in the early 1960s. His wife Ethel is also reported to have undergone psychedelic-assisted therapy with LSD in the 1960s. In 1966, Kennedy led a congressional investigation into the curtailing of many government-funded LSD therapy research projects. In a Senate hearing, he argued that regulators were ending valuable research and stated that LSD "can be very, very helpful in our society if used properly". However, his efforts proved unsuccessful. Subsequently, Kennedy's son, Robert F. Kennedy Jr., has disclosed his own use of psychedelics and his own son taking ayahuasca in the 2020s. In addition, he has advocated for their medical use as the head of the Department of Health and Human Services (HHS) in the 2020s.

== Legacy ==
Kennedy's approach to national problems did not fit neatly into the ideological categories of his time. ...His was a muscular liberalism, committed to an activist federal government but deeply suspicious of concentrated power and certain that fundamental change would best be achieved at the community level, insistent on responsibilities as well as rights, and convinced that the dynamism of capitalism could be the impetus for broadening national growth.

— Edwin O. Guthman and C. Richard Allen, 1993

Biographer Evan Thomas wrote in 2000 that, at times, Kennedy misused his powers by "modern standards", but concluded, "on the whole, even counting his warts, he was a great attorney general." Walter Isaacson commented that Kennedy "turned out arguably to be the best attorney general in history", praising his championing of civil rights and other initiatives of the administration. As Kennedy stepped down from being attorney general in September 1964, The New York Times, which had notably criticized his appointment three years earlier, praised Kennedy for raising the standards of the position. Some of his successors as attorney general have been unfavorably compared to him for not displaying the same level of professional poise. Attorney General Eric Holder cited Kennedy as the inspiration for his belief that the Justice Department could be "a force for that which is right."

Kennedy has also been praised for his oratorical abilities and his skill at creating unity. Joseph A. Palermo of The Huffington Post observed that Kennedy's words "could cut through social boundaries and partisan divides in a way that seems nearly impossible today." Dolores Huerta and Philip W. Johnston expressed the view that Kennedy, both in his speeches and actions, was unique in his willingness to take political risks. That blunt sincerity was said by associates to be authentic; Frank N. Magill wrote that Kennedy's oratorical skills lent their support to minorities and other disenfranchised groups who began seeing him as an ally.

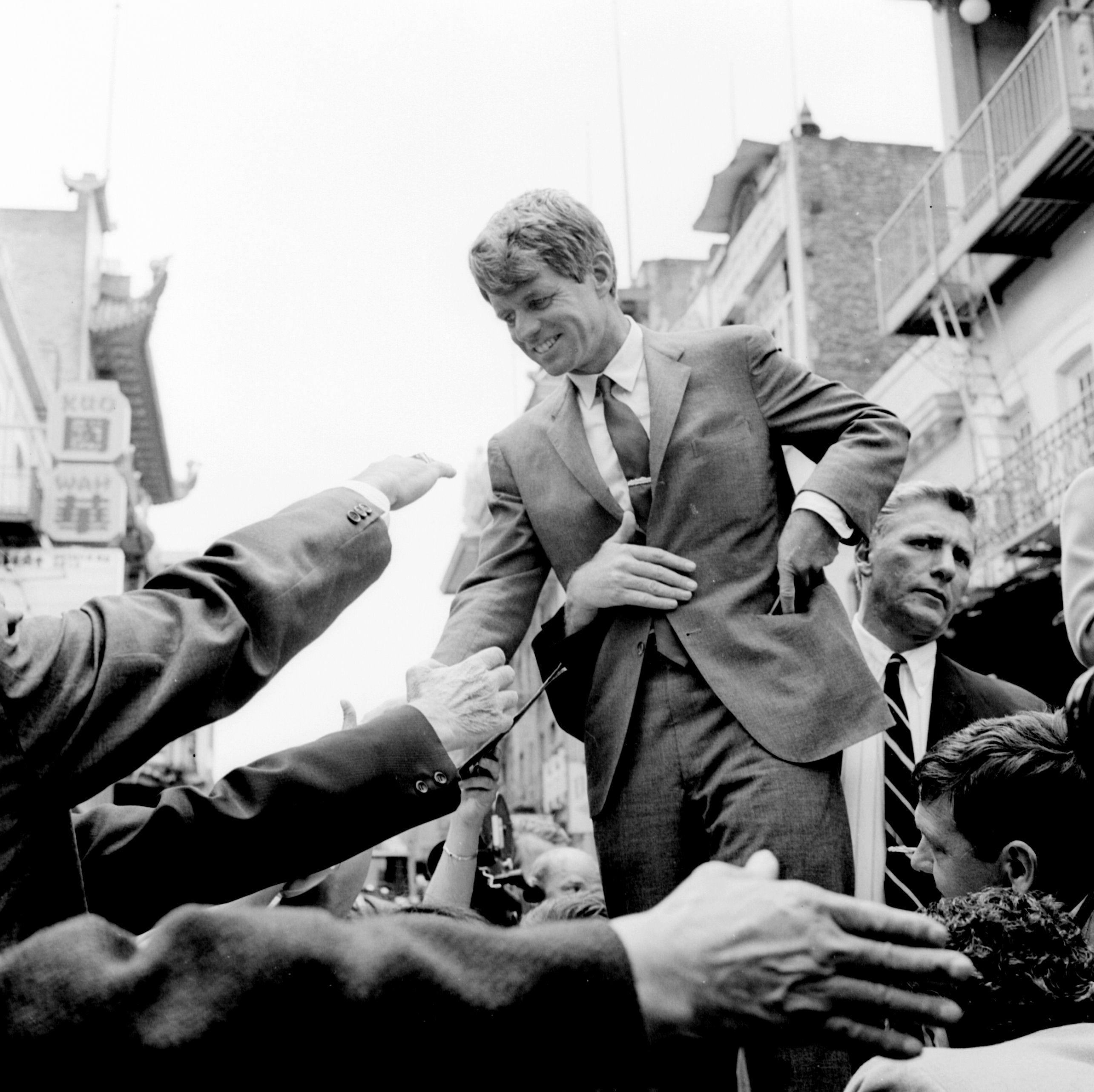
Kennedy campaigning in 1968 (photo by Evan Freed)

Kennedy's assassination was a blow to the optimism for a brighter future that his campaign had brought for many Americans who lived through the turbulent 1960s. Juan Romero, the busboy who shook hands with Kennedy right before he was shot, later said, "It made me realize that no matter how much hope you have it can be taken away in a second."

Kennedy's death has been deemed a significant factor in the Democratic Party's loss of the 1968 presidential election. Since his passing, Kennedy has become generally well-respected by liberals and conservatives, which is far from the polarized views of him during his lifetime. Joe Scarborough, John Ashcroft, Tom Bradley, Mark Dayton, John Kitzhaber, Max Cleland, Tim Cook, Phil Bredesen, Joe Biden, J. K. Rowling, Jim McGreevey, Gavin Newsom, and Ray Mabus have acknowledged Kennedy's influence on them. Josh Zeitz of Politico observed, "Bobby Kennedy has since become an American folk hero—the tough, crusading liberal gunned down in the prime of life."

Kennedy's (and to a lesser extent his older brother's) ideas about using government authority to assist less fortunate peoples became central to American liberalism as a tenet of the "Kennedy legacy."

== Honors ==
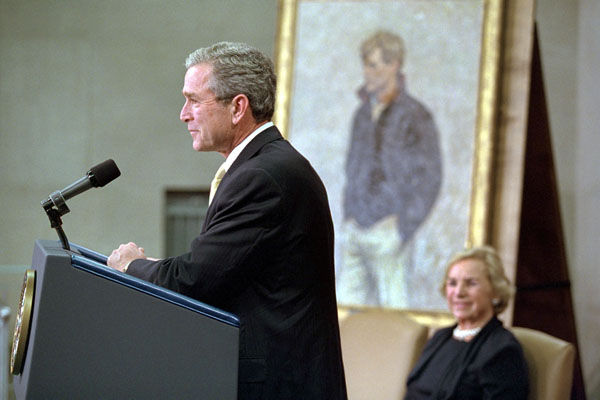
President George W. Bush dedicates the Justice Department building in Robert Kennedy's honor as his widow Ethel Kennedy looks on, c. November 2001.

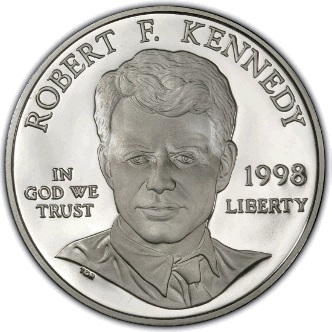
The 1998 Robert F. Kennedy silver dollar

In the months and years after Kennedy's death, numerous roads, public schools, and other facilities across the United States have been named in his memory. Examples include:

- District of Columbia Stadium in Washington, D.C. was renamed Robert F. Kennedy Memorial Stadium in 1969.
- On November 20, 2001, President George W. Bush and Attorney General John Ashcroft dedicated the headquarters of the U.S. Department of Justice as the Robert F. Kennedy Department of Justice Building.
- On June 4, 2008, the Triborough Bridge in New York City was renamed the Robert F. Kennedy Memorial Bridge.

The Robert F. Kennedy Center for Justice and Human Rights was founded in 1968, with an international award program to recognize human rights activists. In a further effort to remember Kennedy and continue his work helping the disadvantaged, a small group of private citizens launched the Robert F. Kennedy Children's Action Corps in 1969. The private, nonprofit, Massachusetts-based organization helps more than 800 abused and neglected children each year.

In 1978, the U.S. Congress awarded Kennedy the Congressional Gold Medal for distinguished service. In 1998, the United States Mint released the Robert F. Kennedy silver dollar, a special dollar coin that featured Kennedy's image on the obverse and the emblems of the U.S. Department of Justice and the U.S. Senate on the reverse.

In January 2025, President Joe Biden posthumously awarded Kennedy the Presidential Medal of Freedom, the highest civilian award of the United States.

Personal items and documents from his office in the Justice Department Building are displayed in a permanent exhibit dedicated to him at the John F. Kennedy Presidential Library and Museum in Boston. Papers from his years as attorney general, senator, peace and civil rights activist and presidential candidate, as well as personal correspondence, are also housed in the library.

=== Kennedy and Martin Luther King Jr. ===
"I have bad news for you, for all of our fellow citizens, and people who love peace all over the world, and that is that Martin Luther King was shot and killed tonight." "Martin Luther King dedicated his life to love and justice for his fellow human beings, and he died because of that effort. In this difficult day, in this difficult time for the United States, it is perhaps well to ask what kind of a nation we are and what direction we want to move in." — Robert Kennedy

Several public institutions jointly honor Kennedy and Martin Luther King Jr.:

- In 1969, the former Woodrow Wilson Junior College, a two-year institution and a constituent campus of the City Colleges of Chicago, was renamed Kennedy–King College.
- In 1994, the Landmark for Peace Memorial sculpture was erected in Indianapolis.

In 2019, Kennedy's "Speech on the Death of Dr. Martin Luther King, Jr." (April 4, 1968) was selected by the Library of Congress for preservation in the National Recording Registry for being "culturally, historically, or aesthetically significant."

== Publications ==
- The Enemy Within: The McClellan Committee's Crusade Against Jimmy Hoffa and Corrupt Labor Unions (1960)
- Just Friends and Brave Enemies (1962)
- The Pursuit of Justice (1964)
- To Seek a Newer World, essays (1967)
- Thirteen Days: A Memoir of the Cuban Missile Crisis, published posthumously (1969)

== Depictions in media ==
Kennedy has been the subject of several documentaries and has appeared in various works of popular culture. Kennedy's role in the Cuban Missile Crisis has been dramatized by Martin Sheen in the TV docudrama The Missiles of October (1974) and by Steven Culp in the political thriller film Thirteen Days (2000). The film Bobby (2006) is the story of multiple people's lives leading up to Kennedy's assassination. It employs stock footage from his presidential campaign and he is briefly portrayed by Dave Fraunces. Barry Pepper won the 2011 Primetime Emmy Award for Outstanding Lead Actor in a Limited or Anthology Series or Movie for his portrayal of Kennedy in The Kennedys (2011), an eight-part miniseries. He is portrayed by Peter Sarsgaard in the film about Jacqueline Kennedy, Jackie (2016), and by Jack Huston in the Martin Scorsese crime film The Irishman (2019).

== See also ==
- List of assassinated American politicians
- List of peace activists
- List of members of the United States Congress killed or wounded in office
- List of members of the United States Congress who died in office (1950–1999)

Legal offices
Preceded by William P. Rogers	United States Attorney General; 1961–1964	Succeeded by Nicholas Katzenbach
Party political offices
Preceded by Frank Hogan	Democratic nominee for U.S. Senator from New York (Class 1); 1964	Succeeded by Richard Ottinger
Preceded by Frank Hogan	Liberal nominee for U.S. Senator from New York (Class 1); 1964	Succeeded by Charles Goodell
U.S. Senate
Preceded by Kenneth Keating	U.S. Senator (Class 1) from New York; 1965–1968; Served alongside: Jacob K. Javits	Succeeded by Charles Goodell
