= John F. Kennedy 1960 presidential campaign =

American political campaign

John F. Kennedy for President 1960
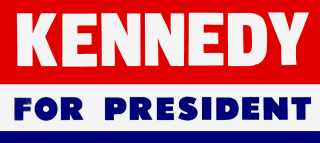
- Campaign: 1960 Democratic primaries 1960 U.S. presidential election
- Candidate: John F. Kennedy; U.S. Senator from Massachusetts (1953–1960); Lyndon B. Johnson; U.S. Senator from Texas (1949–1961)
- Affiliation: Democratic Party
- Status: Announced: January 2, 1960; Official nominee: July 15, 1960; Won election: November 8, 1960; Certification: January 6, 1961; Inaugurated: January 20, 1961
- Headquarters: Boston, Massachusetts
- Slogan(s): A Time For Greatness; We Can Do Better; Leadership for the 60s
- Theme song: "High Hopes" by Jimmy Van Heusen and Sammy Cahn

The 1960 presidential campaign of John F. Kennedy, then junior United States senator from Massachusetts, was formally launched on January 2, 1960, as Senator Kennedy announced his intention to seek the Democratic Party nomination for the presidency of the United States in the 1960 presidential election.

Kennedy was nominated by the Democratic Party at the national convention on July 15, 1960, and he named Senator Lyndon B. Johnson as his vice-presidential running mate. On November 8, 1960, they defeated incumbent Vice President Richard Nixon and United Nations Ambassador Henry Cabot Lodge Jr. in the general election. Kennedy was sworn in as president on January 20, 1961, and would serve until his assassination on November 22, 1963. His brothers Robert and Ted would both later run for president in 1968 and 1980 respectively, but Robert was assassinated, and Ted did not receive the nomination.

== Background ==
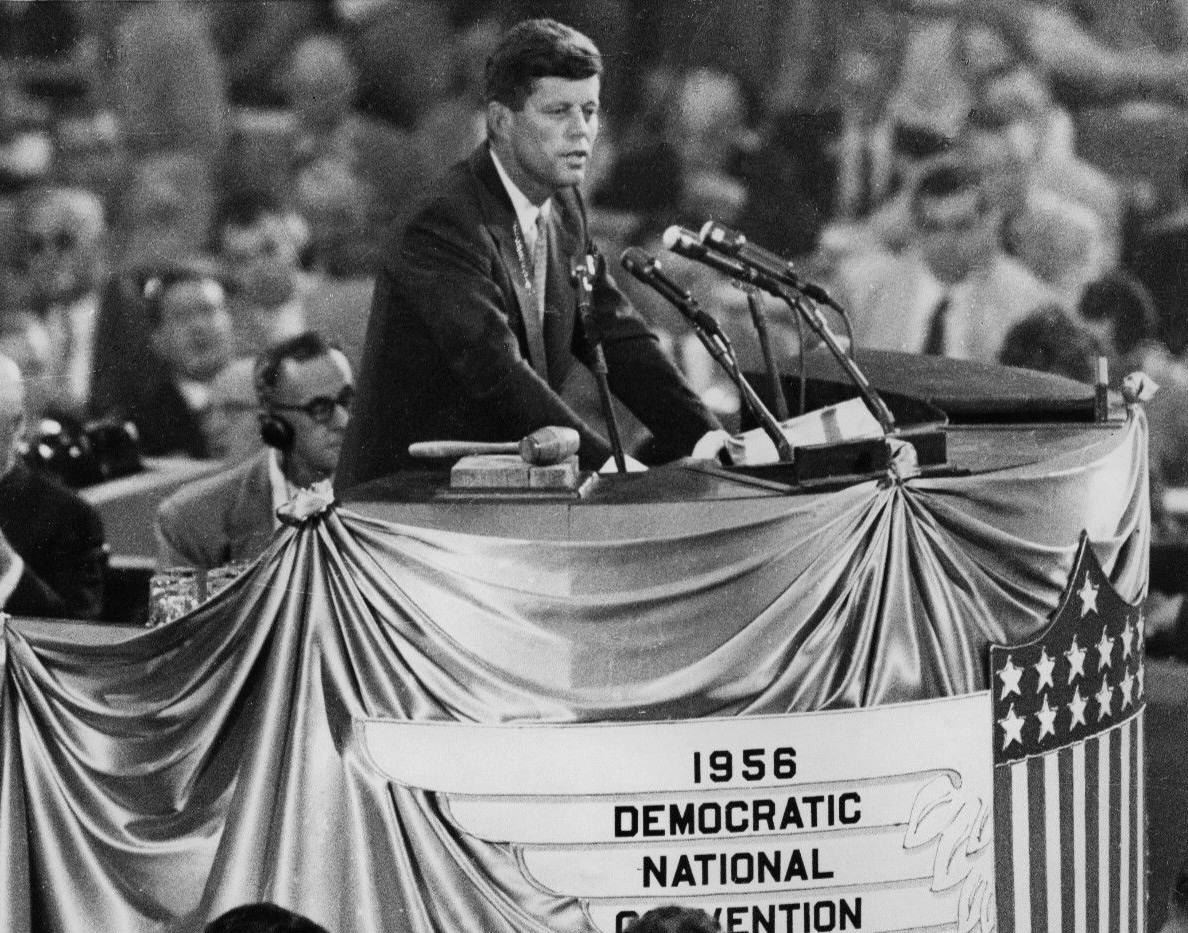
Kennedy endorsing Adlai Stevenson II for the presidential nomination at the 1956 Democratic National Convention

During the 1956 presidential election, Kennedy was speculated as a possible vice presidential nominee. Before the vice presidential nomination ballot multiple Massachusetts politicians, including former Governor Paul A. Dever, gave their support to Kennedy and pushed for other state delegations to support him. On the first ballot, Kennedy came in second place to Senator Estes Kefauver, but came ahead of him on the second ballot due to support from Mayor Robert F. Wagner Jr., another Catholic, and Southerners who opposed Kefauver's anti-segregation beliefs. However, on the third ballot, Kefauver won with the support of Senator Albert Gore Sr., but would lose in the general election alongside Adlai Stevenson II. Kennedy, however, remained untarnished by Stevenson's defeat, and the exposure he received at the convention made him a serious contender for the Democratic presidential nomination in 1960. Kennedy later stated that had he won the vice presidential nomination his political career would have ended due to the Republican landslide in the general election.

In 1957, Kennedy won the Pulitzer Prize for his best-selling book, Profiles in Courage, and his appointments to the Senate's Foreign Relations Committee and Select Committee on Labor Rackets added to his public stature. Benefiting also from the handiwork of speechwriter Ted Sorensen, articles published under Kennedy's name began appearing often in serious magazines, among them the Atlantic Monthly and the New Republic.

In 1958, Kennedy set out to win re-election to the U.S. Senate by a wide margin, believing this would improve his visibility in the Democratic Party and nationally. He defeated his Republican opponent with 73.6 percent of the vote, boosting his presidential profile for 1960. Kennedy's margin of victory was 874,608 votes—the largest ever in Massachusetts politics and the greatest of any senatorial candidate that year. In the aftermath of his re-election, Kennedy began preparing to run for president by traveling throughout the U.S., establishing contacts with potential Democratic delegates, with the aim of building his candidacy for 1960.

On October 24, 1958, Frank Sinatra came out in support of a possible Kennedy presidential campaign and on June 16, 1959, Governor John Malcolm Patterson stated that he would work towards Kennedy receiving the Democratic presidential nomination.

On December 17, 1959, a letter from Kennedy's staff that was to be sent to "active and influential Democrats" was leaked stating that he would announce his presidential campaign on January 2, 1960.

== Announcement ==
On January 2, 1960, Kennedy formally announced that he would seek the Democratic presidential nomination at the Russell Senate Office Building in Washington, D.C., and stated that he would participate in multiple primaries, including New Hampshire. He also stated that he would not accept the vice presidential nomination and would rather stay in the Senate if he lost the presidential nomination. Kennedy filed to run in the New Hampshire primary on January 8, being the only major candidate to do so along with minor candidate Paul C. Fisher.

Kennedy established his campaign headquarters at 260 Tremont Street, a 12-story commercial building in Boston. He named his younger brother, Robert F. Kennedy, as campaign manager.

== Issues ==
=== Civil rights ===
On the issue of civil rights, Kennedy had scant firsthand experience of the severity of southern life. He circumvented the national debate over equal rights by approaching the subject as a local issue. Robert F. Kennedy later reflected, "We weren't thinking of the Negroes of Mississippi or Alabama—what should be done for them. We were thinking of what needed to be done in Massachusetts." According to author Carl M. Brauer, Kennedy's goal was to neutralize the civil rights issue and avoid splitting the party before the 1960 election.

A crucial issue in the 1960 campaign, Kennedy faced the challenge of promoting policies that white southern Democrats supported while, at the same time, courting black voters away from the Republican Party. Just a few weeks before the election, Martin Luther King Jr. was arrested in Atlanta for a sit-in and sentenced to four months hard labor. Though politically risky, Kennedy phoned Coretta Scott King, to express his concern, while a call from Robert Kennedy to the judge helped secure King's safe release. The Kennedy brothers' personal intervention led to a public endorsement by Martin Luther King Sr., who had supported Nixon earlier in the campaign. The publicizing of this endorsement, combined with other campaign efforts, contributed to increased support among black voters for Kennedy, which was pivotal in the swing states of Illinois, Michigan and South Carolina that JFK carried. In 1956, Adlai Stevenson won 61 percent of the African American vote; in 1960, Kennedy received 68 percent.

=== Cold War ===
The issue that dominated the election was the rising Cold War tensions between the United States and the Soviet Union. In 1957, the Soviets had launched Sputnik, the first man-made satellite to orbit Earth. Soon afterwards, some American leaders warned that the nation was falling behind communist countries in science and technology. In Cuba, the revolutionary regime of Fidel Castro became a close ally of the Soviet Union in 1960, heightening fears of communist subversion in the Western Hemisphere. Public opinion polls revealed that more than half the American people thought that war with the Soviet Union was inevitable.

Kennedy took advantage of increased Cold War tension by emphasizing a perceived "missile gap" between the United States and Soviet Union. He argued that under the Republicans, the nation had fallen behind the Soviet Union, both militarily and economically, and that, as president, he would "get America moving again." He proposed a bi-partisan congressional investigation about the possibility that the Soviet Union was ahead of the United States in developing missiles. He also noted in an October 18 speech that several senior U.S. military officers had long criticized the Eisenhower administration's defense spending policies.

=== Religion ===
Kennedy speaking before the Greater Houston Ministerial Association on the issue of his religion, September 12, 1960

A key concern in Kennedy's campaign was the widespread skepticism among Protestants about his Roman Catholic religion. He was only the second Catholic ever to be nominated for president by a major party (the first was Democratic Governor Al Smith of New York, who lost to Herbert Hoover in 1928). This raised serious questions about the electability of a Catholic candidate, particularly in the Bible Belt South. Some Protestants, especially Southern Baptists and Lutherans, feared that having a Catholic in the White House would give undue influence to the Pope in the nation's affairs. In January, Governor Happy Chandler predicted that Kennedy would lose multiple Southern states, including Kentucky, due to his religion. In September, Kennedy confronted the religious issue in an appearance before the Greater Houston Ministerial Association. He said, "I am not the Catholic candidate for president. I am the Democratic Party's candidate for president who also happens to be a Catholic. I do not speak for my Church on public matters – and the Church does not speak for me." He promised to respect the separation of church and state, and not to allow Catholic officials to dictate public policy to him. Nixon decided to leave religious issues out of the campaign and hammer the perception that Kennedy was too inexperienced to sit in the Oval Office.

== Campaign ==
=== March–June: Primaries ===
1960 Democratic primaries results John F. Kennedy Lyndon B. Johnson Hubert H. Humphrey Various (Note: Favorite sons received the support of Missouri (Stuart Symington), Florida (George Smathers), New Jersey (Robert Meyner), Mississippi (Carroll Gartin), and Hawaii.)

Kennedy had won elections in Massachusetts by relying on his family's wealth and connections, bypassing the local Democratic organization. Winning the nomination, however, required the support of substantial blocs of convention delegates from the large states, often controlled by a single person (i.e., Governor David L. Lawrence of Pennsylvania and Mayor Richard J. Daley of Chicago). Historian James Hilty writes that the Kennedy campaign strategy was to win primaries to demonstrate John Kennedy's electability to the party bosses. There were only sixteen primaries in 1960, and most of them were in smaller states with relatively few delegates at stake. So they handpicked states where they thought they could win impressively, while working behind the scenes building support elsewhere.

Kennedy won the New Hampshire primary without any opposition on March 8, and received the highest vote total for any Democratic candidate at that point. After the results came in, Kennedy expressed enthusiasm while in Madison: "I'm very happy about it; we did better than I thought we would." Chicago mayor Richard J. Daley promised to deliver Kennedy the support of Cook County's delegates, so long as Kennedy won competitive primaries in other states.

Wisconsin was the first contested primary in the race and Kennedy faced U.S. Senator Hubert Humphrey from neighboring Minnesota. Humphrey attempted to use Governor Gaylord Nelson as a favorite son stand-in for himself, but U.S. Senator William Proxmire threatened to run as a stand-in for Kennedy if that happened. Kennedy campaigned in Wisconsin for 29 days starting on February 16. The Kennedy campaign had the two objectives of decisively defeating Humphrey in most parts of the state to end his candidacy altogether and portray Kennedy's national appeal at capturing votes. Kennedy's siblings combed the state looking for votes, leading Humphrey to complain that he "felt like an independent merchant running against a chain store." Kennedy won the primary with 56% of the vote and placed first in six congressional districts compared to Humphrey winning four districts. Kennedy won all fourteen counties with a Catholic population higher than 35% while Humphrey won in areas with more Protestants. Kennedy's margin of victory had come almost entirely from Catholic areas, and, thus, Humphrey decided to continue the contest in the heavily Protestant state of West Virginia. Days before the primary, Kennedy said it had been the "toughest, closest, most meaningful."

Kennedy won the Illinois and Massachusetts primaries as a write-in candidate with no other Democrats on the ballot and in Indiana with minor opposition.

Joseph P. Kennedy Sr. told his son to not participate in the West Virginia primary as "It's a nothing state and they'll kill him over the Catholic thing." On May 4, Humphrey and Kennedy took part in a televised one-on-one debate at WCHS-TV in Charleston, ahead of the state's primary. Kennedy outperformed Humphrey and, in the days following, Kennedy made substantial gains over Humphrey in the polls. Humphrey's campaign was low on funds, and could not compete for advertising and other "get-out-the-vote" drives with Kennedy's well-financed and well-organized campaign. On May 10, Kennedy defeated Humphrey in the West Virginia primary with over 60 percent of the vote, and Humphrey announced his withdrawal from the race that night.

Jimmy Hoffa, President of the International Brotherhood of Teamsters, criticized Kennedy for his amendment on the Landrum–Griffin Act and stated he was a fraud that ignored the labor unions. However, David J. McDonald, the president of the United Steelworkers of America, stated that Kennedy Sr. aided the labor unions during the steel strike of 1959 and George Meany, the president of the AFL–CIO, praised Kennedy for his amendment. Senator Wayne Morse also criticized Kennedy for his support of the bill and stated that it was one of the main reasons he was opposing Kennedy in the Oregon primary on May 20, the only state in which Kennedy directly challenged a favorite son candidate. He defeated Morse 51 to 32%.

=== July: Democratic National Convention ===
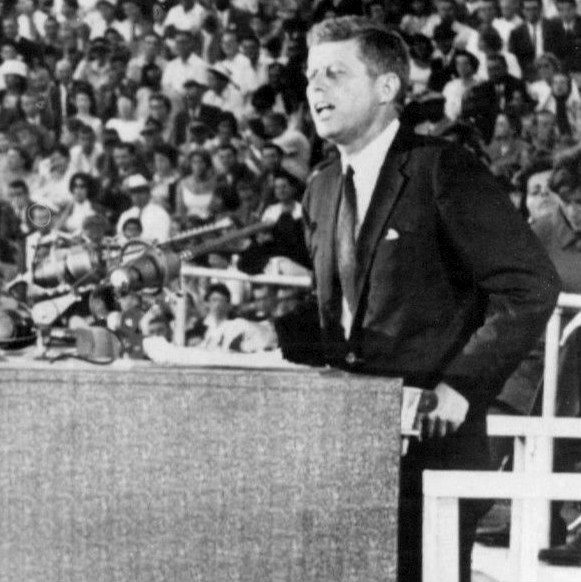
Kennedy delivering his acceptance speech at the Democratic National Convention. The speech was given at the Los Angeles Memorial Coliseum on July 15, 1960

Kennedy arrived at the Democratic National Convention in Los Angeles (held from July 11 to 15) with 600 of the 761 delegates needed to secure the nomination. Kennedy's candidacy faced opposition from former President Harry Truman, who was concerned about his lack of experience. Senate Majority Leader Lyndon Johnson had planned to sit out the primaries (except as a write-in candidate) and present himself as a powerful compromise candidate at the convention. Two Johnson supporters, including John B. Connally, brought up the question of Kennedy's health. Connally claimed that Kennedy suffered from Addison's disease. JFK's press secretary Pierre Salinger denied the story. A Kennedy physician, Janet Travell, falsely asserted that the senator's adrenal glands functioned normally. It was also denied that Kennedy was on cortisone. Johnson challenged Kennedy to a televised debate before a joint meeting of the Texas and Massachusetts delegations, which Kennedy accepted. Most observers believed that Kennedy won the debate, and Johnson was unable to expand his delegate support beyond the South. A Gallup poll on July 10 showed Kennedy leading among Democrats with 41 percent; Adlai Stevenson had 25 percent, Lyndon Johnson 16 percent, and Stuart Symington 7 percent.

Kennedy managed to win just enough delegates for a first-ballot nomination, despite last minute "Stop Kennedy" movements led by Johnson and others. He did not reach the 761 votes required for the nomination until the final state in the roll call, Wyoming. At the conclusion of the first ballot, Kennedy had 806 votes to 409 for Johnson and 79.5 for Stevenson. Favorite sons and minor candidates split the remaining 142 votes. Kennedy received support from 3% of the Southern delegates, but was supported by 68% of the delegates outside the South.

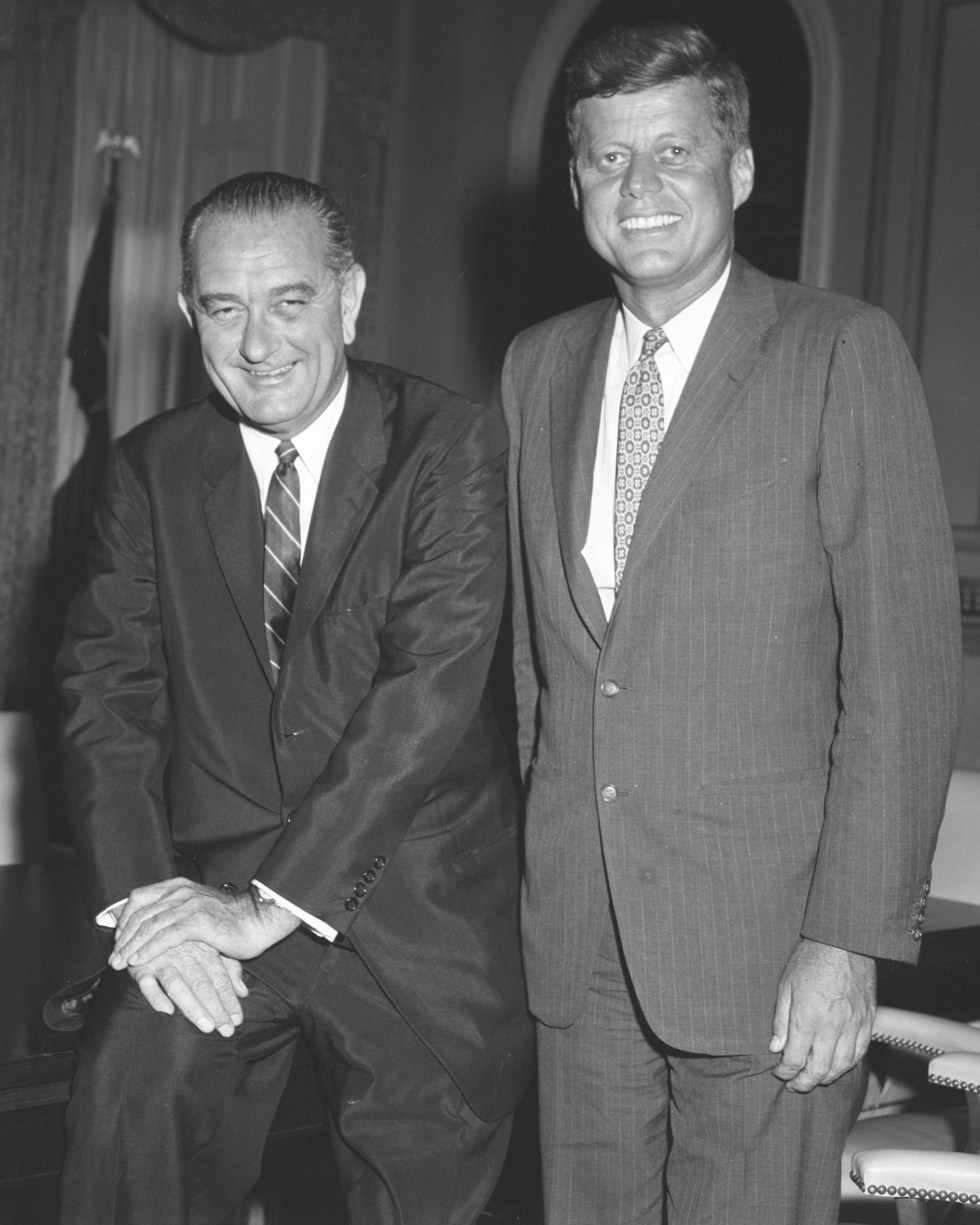
Kennedy (right) with Lyndon B. Johnson

Kennedy was the first U.S. senator since Warren G. Harding in 1920 to be nominated for the presidency by either the Democrats or the Republicans. He chose Johnson as his vice-presidential nominee. This combination created what some called a "Boston–Austin axis" that helped balance the Democratic ticket geographically. Kennedy realized that he could not be elected without the support of traditional Southern Democrats, most of whom had backed Johnson. The choice infuriated many in labor. AFL-CIO President George Meany called Johnson "the arch foe of labor," while Illinois AFL-CIO President Reuben Soderstrom asserted Kennedy had "made chumps out of leaders of the American labor movement." Robert F. Kennedy, who hated Johnson for his attacks on the Kennedy family, and who favored labor leader Walter Reuther, later said that his brother offered the position to Johnson as a courtesy and did not predict him to accept it. When he did accept, Robert Kennedy tried to change Johnson's mind, and failed. Biographer Robert Caro offers a different perspective: writing that on July 14, John Kennedy asked his brother to prepare an estimate of upcoming electoral votes, "including Texas." Robert Kennedy called Pierre Salinger and Kenneth O'Donnell to assist him. Realizing the ramifications of counting Texas votes as their own, Salinger asked him whether he was considering a Kennedy–Johnson ticket, and Robert replied, "Yes." Between 9 and 10 am, John Kennedy called Pennsylvania Governor David L. Lawrence, a Johnson backer, to request that Lawrence nominate Johnson for vice president if Johnson were to accept the role, and then went to Johnson's suite at the Biltmore Hotel to discuss a mutual ticket at 10:15 am. John Kennedy then returned to his suite to announce the Kennedy–Johnson ticket to his closest supporters and Northern political bosses. According to Caro, Kennedy may have made the offer in earnest due to Johnson's friendly relationship with Speaker of the House Sam Rayburn, and Kennedy's desire to remove Johnson as Senate Majority Leader in favor of the more liberal Mike Mansfield.

In accepting the presidential nomination, Kennedy gave his well-known "New Frontier" speech, saying, "For the problems are not all solved and the battles are not all won—and we stand today on the edge of a New Frontier. ... But the New Frontier of which I speak is not a set of promises—it is a set of challenges. It sums up not what I intend to offer the American people, but what I intend to ask of them." Kennedy hoped to pull together key elements of the Roosevelt coalition of the 1930s—urban communities of color, ethnicity-based voting blocs, and organized labor. He also hoped to win back conservative Catholics who had deserted the Democrats to vote for Eisenhower in 1952 and 1956, and to hold his own in the South.

=== September–October: Debates ===
Full broadcast of the September 26, 1960 debate

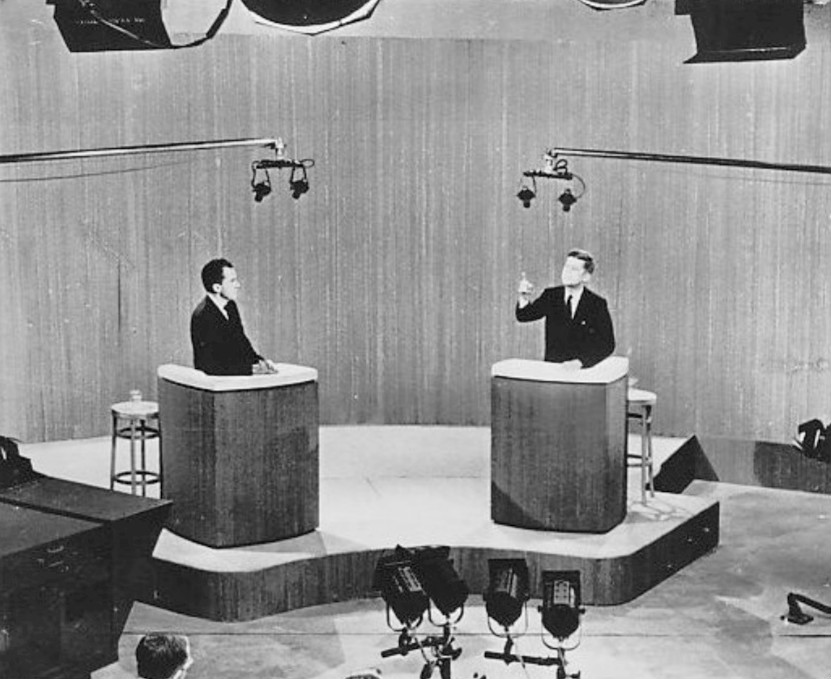
The fourth and final presidential debate on October 21, 1960

The Kennedy and Nixon campaigns agreed to a series of televised debates. Many in the Nixon camp, including President Eisenhower, urged the vice president to reject the debate proposal and deny Kennedy invaluable national exposure. Nixon, an experienced debater, accepted. A provision of the Federal Communications Act had been suspended by Congress earlier in the year to permit the networks to broadcast the debates without having to provide equal time for third-party candidates. An estimated 70 million Americans, about two-thirds of the electorate, watched the first debate on September 26. However, up to 20 million fewer viewers watched the three remaining debates than the first. Political observers at the time felt that Kennedy won the first debate, Nixon won the second and third debates, while the fourth debate, which was seen as the strongest performance by both men, was a draw.

Kennedy had met the day before the first debate with the producer to discuss the design of the set and the placement of the cameras. Nixon, just out of the hospital after a painful knee injury, did not take advantage of this opportunity. Kennedy wore a blue suit and shirt to cut down on glare and appeared sharply focused against the gray studio background. Nixon wore a light-colored suit that blended into the gray background; in combination with the harsh studio lighting that left Nixon perspiring, he offered a less-than commanding presence. By contrast, Kennedy appeared relaxed, tanned, and telegenic.

It is often claimed that people who watched the debate on television overwhelmingly believed Kennedy had won, while radio listeners (a smaller audience) thought Nixon had ended up defeating him. However, that has been disputed. No such comparative polls exist, however, and the market research on which those conclusions rest incorporated too few radio listeners to be statistically valid. Only one poll split TV and radio voters like this and the methodology of the pollsters was poor, failing to account for pre-debate political or religious biases and only interviewing 178 radio listeners who believed the debate had been won by either candidate. The location of the polling is also unknown, even though Nixon would have been more popular pre-debate anyway in Protestant, rural areas with less access to television. 1960 was a close race and there is no polling available consistent with the idea that Nixon lost or Kennedy gained support as a result of the debate. Researchers David Vancil and Sue Pendell point out that Nixon did not win the debate by strength of argument either; Democratic figures were satisfied with Kennedy's debate performance and even many Southern Democrats who had been apathetic or hostile towards Kennedy were impressed, but Nixon's performance alarmed Republican figures who thought that his defensiveness and me-tooism (repeatedly emphasising his agreement with Kennedy) realised their worst fears and was a surprisingly poor performance from him. Nonetheless, Gallup polls in October showed Kennedy moving into a slight but consistent lead over Nixon (49% to 46%) after the candidates were in a statistical tie for most of August and September. Pollster Elmo Roper concluded that the debates raised interest, boosted turnout, and gave Kennedy an extra two million votes, mostly as a result of the first debate. The debates are now considered a milestone in American political history—the point at which the medium of television began to play a dominant role in politics.

=== November: General election ===
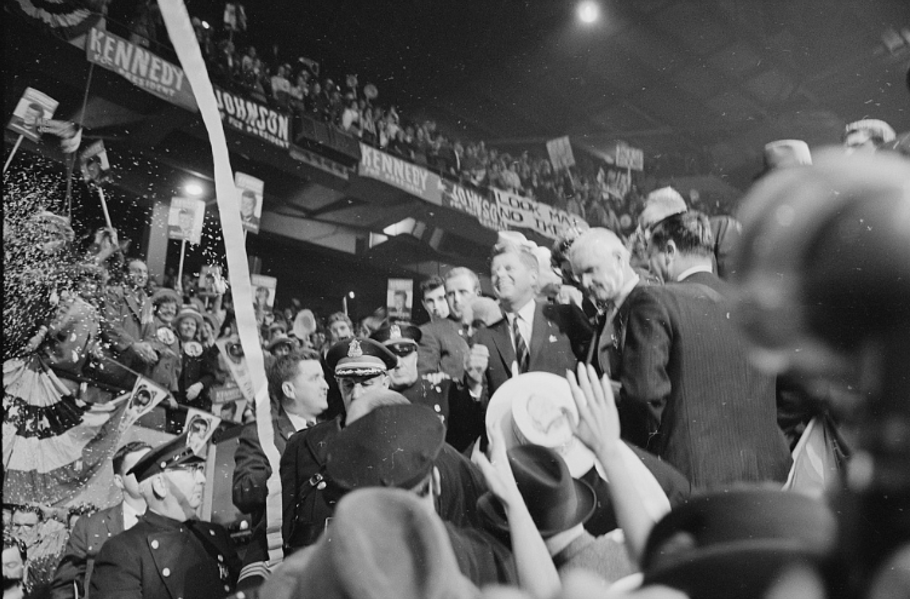
Kennedy (center) surrounded by supporters at the Boston Garden on the night before Election Day, c. November 7, 1960

On November 1, Kennedy started a seventeen state campaign drive to visit California, Arizona, New Mexico, Texas, Oklahoma, Virginia, Ohio, Michigan, Illinois, New York, Connecticut, New Jersey, Vermont, New Hampshire, Rhode Island, Maine, and Massachusetts while Nixon was focused on completing his promise to campaign in all fifty states that he made at the Republican National Convention. Larry Sabato and other political commentators would later criticize Nixon's decision to campaign in all fifty states as one of the reasons for his defeat as it prevented him from focusing on important swing states.

Allan Shivers, the former Democratic Governor of Texas who supported Eisenhower in the 1952 and 1956 presidential elections, criticized Kennedy for accepting the endorsement of the Liberal Party of New York, that the Democratic platform was more restrictive on farmers than communist countries, and that Nixon would win Texas due to his leadership experience at an event sponsored by the Democrats for Nixon.

Theodore H. White wrote that Kennedy's campaign was focused on winning New York, Pennsylvania, California, Michigan, Texas, Illinois, Ohio, New Jersey, and Massachusetts as those states held 237 of the 269 electoral votes required to win the election. The remainder would come from southern, New England, or midwestern states.

=== Results ===
Electoral college results of the general election, November 8, 1960

On November 8, Kennedy defeated Nixon in one of the closest presidential elections of the 20th century. In the national popular vote, by most accounts, Kennedy led Nixon by just two-tenths of one percent (49.7% to 49.5%), while in the Electoral College, he won 303 votes to Nixon's 219 (269 were needed to win). Fourteen electors from Mississippi and Alabama refused to support Kennedy because of his support for the civil rights movement; they voted for Senator Harry F. Byrd of Virginia, as did an elector from Oklahoma. Kennedy thus became the third of five candidates elected president in the 20th century without winning a majority of the popular vote (joining Woodrow Wilson in 1912 and 1916, and Harry S. Truman in 1948; in 1968, Nixon would become the fourth, and in 1992 and 1996, Bill Clinton would become the fifth candidate in the 20th century to win the presidency without a majority). Due to the way Alabama conducted its presidential election, the popular vote winner was left in contention and there were accusations of election illegalities in Illinois and Texas due to Kennedy's narrow victories with 8,858 and 46,266 votes respectively. Kennedy was initially projected to win California by 37,000 votes, but after absentee ballots were counted, Nixon won the state by 35,623 votes. Nixon was also projected to win Hawaii, but a recount was conducted and Kennedy narrowly won by 115 votes.

Before midnight, The New York Times had gone to press with the headline, "Kennedy Elected President". As the election again became too close to call, Times managing editor Turner Catledge hoped that, as he recalled in his memoirs, "a certain Midwestern mayor would steal enough votes to pull Kennedy through", thus allowing the Times to avoid the embarrassment of announcing the wrong winner, as the Chicago Tribune had memorably done twelve years earlier. NBC News didn't call the race until 7 a.m. the following morning.

In his victory speech at the Hyannis Armory, Kennedy declared: "To all Americans, I say that the next four years are going to be difficult and challenging years for us all; that a supreme national effort will be needed to move this country safely through the 1960s. I ask your help, and I can assure you that every degree of my spirit that I possess will be devoted to the long-range interest of the United States and to the cause of freedom around the world."

Kennedy was the first person born in the 20th century to be elected president, and, at age 43, the youngest person elected to the office. (Note: Theodore Roosevelt was nine months younger when he first assumed the presidency on September 14, 1901, but he was not elected to the office until 1904, when he was 46.) He was also the first Roman Catholic elected to the presidency.

== Analysis ==
The closeness of the 1960 presidential election can be explained by a number of factors. Kennedy benefited from the economic recession of 1957–1958, which hurt the standing of the incumbent Republican Party, and he had the advantage of 17 million more registered Democrats than Republicans. Furthermore, the new votes that Kennedy, the first Roman Catholic president, gained among Catholics almost neutralized the new votes Nixon gained among Protestants. Kennedy's campaigning skills decisively outmatched Nixon's, who exhausted time and resources campaigning in all fifty states, while Kennedy focused on campaigning in populous swing states. Kennedy emphasized his youth, while Nixon focused heavily on his experience. Kennedy relied on Johnson to hold the South, and used television effectively. Although 70 percent of the nation's newspapers backed Nixon, Kennedy won a key endorsement from The New York Times. Many working journalists, including Joseph Alsop and Ben Bradlee, enjoyed close friendships with Kennedy. Phil Graham of The Washington Post said that he and Alsop were "idolatrous" toward Kennedy.

The NES survey reported that in the South, Kennedy received the support of 52% of white voters and a majority of black voters. The highest amount of Democratic defection in the South was among Protestants who attended church regularly.

== Controversies ==
=== Illinois ===
Ben Adamowski, a Republican who lost reelection as Cook County State's Attorney to Democratic nominee Daniel P. Ward, requested a recount of the state's attorney race. Republicans sought to use this recount, as they could not order a recount of the presidential results, to prove that fraud had been committed in the presidential election. Sidney Holzman, the chair of the Board of Election Commissioners, stated that only the three BEC members could handle the ballots and would only recount the ballots for the state's attorney election. Judge Thaddeus Adesko ruled that twenty-five teams of counters had to be used and that the other elections would be included in the recount.

The recount was finished on December 9, and showed that in six towns around Chicago mistakes of ten votes or more in favor of Kennedy occurred in 3.1% of the precincts, those in favor of Nixon occurred in 2.6%, and those in favor of third-parties occurred in 4.8%. 11% of the precincts in Chicago had errors of ten votes of more in Kennedy's favor and 8.6% in Nixon's favor. Kennedy's vote was overcounted in 38% of Chicago's precincts while Nixon's vote was overcounted in 40%. Nixon's total was increased by 926 votes.

=== Hawaii ===
On November 8, the final unofficial vote total showed Kennedy winning Hawaii by 102 votes with 92,193 votes against Nixon's 92,091 votes. However, Nixon was declared the winner after more absentee ballots came in increasing his margin to 141 on November 17. On December 2, a recount of 37 precincts was ordered by Circuit Court Judge Ronald B. Jamieson and later ordered more precincts to be recounted. On December 16, Kennedy overtook Nixon in the popular vote and on December 27, Jamieson ruled that Kennedy had won by 115 votes.

However, Governor William F. Quinn had signed the certificate giving Hawaii's three electoral votes to the Republicans, but he later signed another certificate after the recount showed Kennedy winning. When Congress convened on January 3, 1961, Nixon, as president of the Senate had to preside over a joint session to certify the presidential election, certified Kennedy as the winner of Hawaii's electoral votes.

== Gallery ==
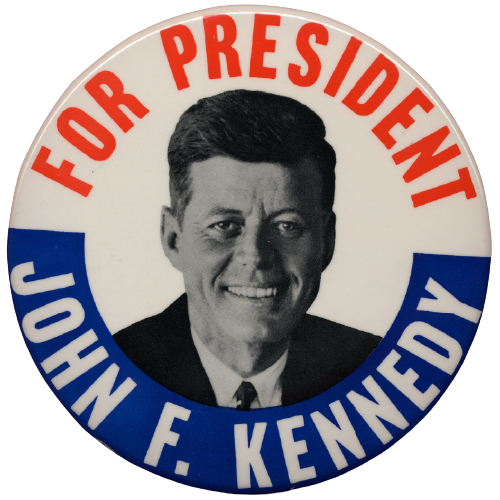
Kennedy's campaign button

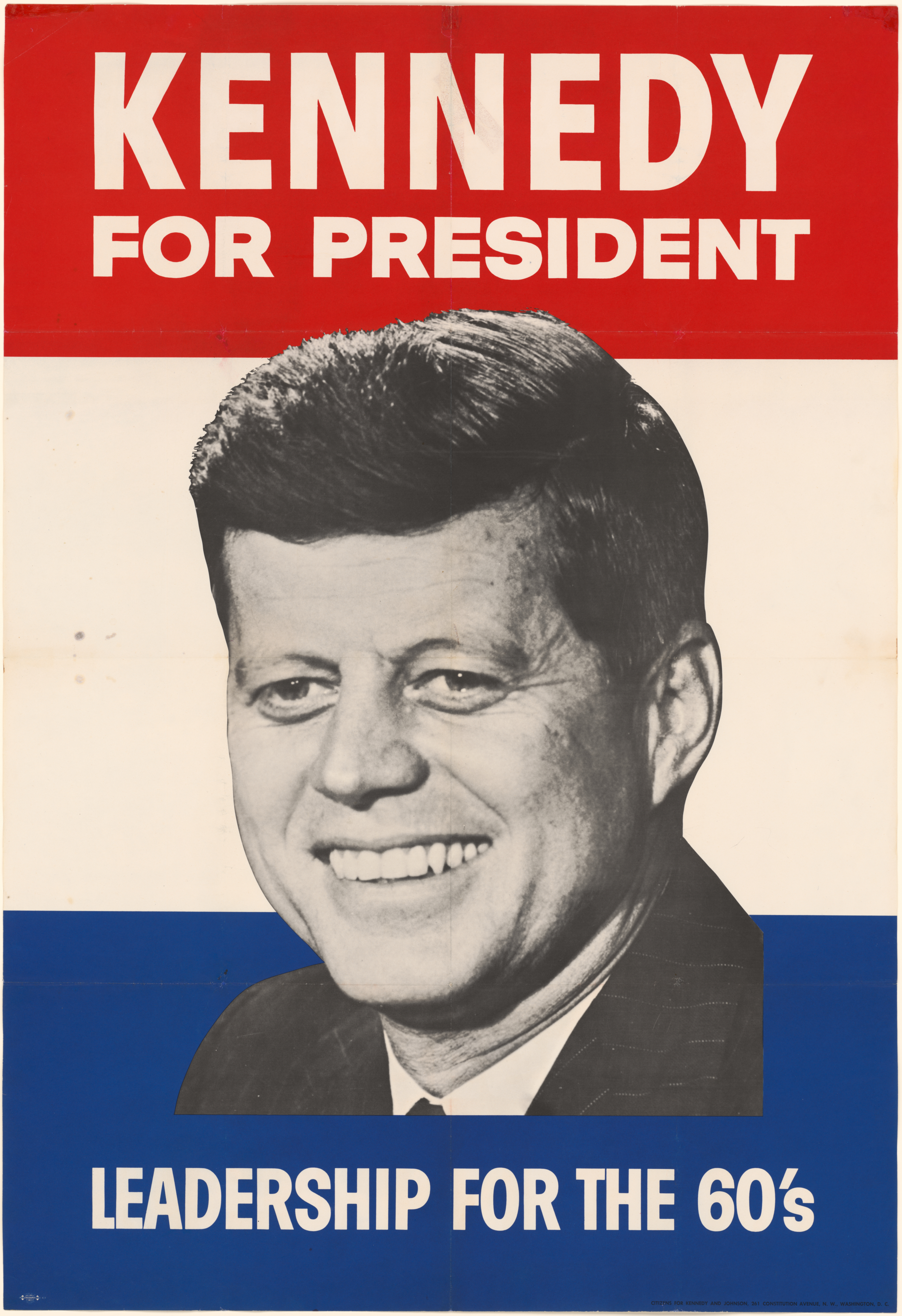
1960 presidential campaign poster

Kennedy's 1960 campaign song "High Hopes" was performed by Frank Sinatra

A television advertisement from the 1960 campaign

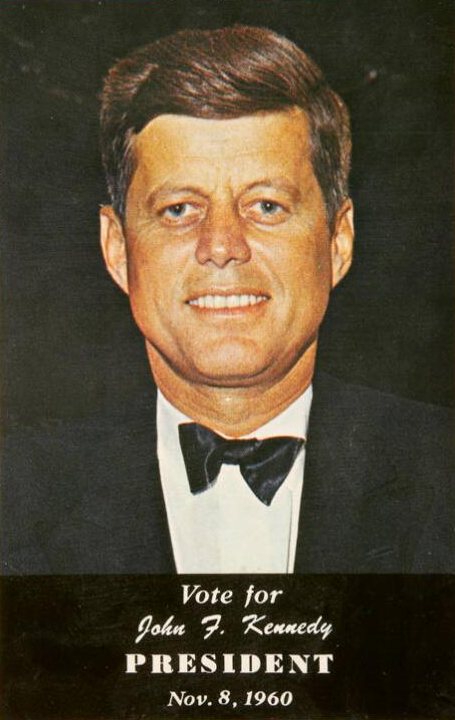
1960 presidential campaign postcard

== Endorsements ==
List of political endorsements

Organizations

- AFL–CIO
- Americans for Democratic Action, liberal American political organization advocating progressive policies
- Liberal Party of New York

Newspapers

- Chattanooga Times
- The Atlanta Constitution
- The Atlanta Journal
- Opelika Daily News, daily newspaper in Alabama
- The New York Times

Congress

- Franklin D. Roosevelt Jr., member of the United States House of Representatives from New York's 20th congressional district (1949–1955)
- Stephen M. Young, Senator from Ohio (1959–1971)

Governors

- Pat Brown, 32nd Governor of California (1959–1967)
- Michael DiSalle, 60th Governor of Ohio (1959–1963)
- Foster Furcolo, 60th Governor of Massachusetts (1957–1961)
- John Malcolm Patterson, 44th Governor of Alabama (1959–1963)
- Abraham Ribicoff, 80th Governor of Connecticut (1955–1961)
- G. Mennen Williams, 41st Governor of Michigan (1949–1961)

State legislators

- Hiram G. Andrews, 125th Speaker of the Pennsylvania House of Representatives (1955–1956; 1959–1962)

Municipal officials

- Bernard L. Boutin, Mayor of Laconia (1955–1959)

Notable individuals

- Brendan Behan, poet and novelist
- Charles Peters, journalist
- Walter Reuther, 4th President of the United Auto Workers (1946–1970)
- Harry S. Truman (for the general election), 33rd President of the United States

Celebrities

- Harry Belafonte, singer
- Milton Berle, comedian
- Joey Bishop, comedian
- Lloyd Bridges, actor
- Diahann Carroll, singer
- Nat King Cole, singer
- Tony Curtis, actor
- Sammy Davis Jr., singer
- Jimmy Durante, comedian
- Ella Fitzgerald, singer
- Judy Garland, actress
- George Jessel, actor
- Gene Kelly, actor
- Hope Lange, actress
- Peter Lawford, actor
- Peggy Lee, singer
- Janet Leigh, actress
- Shirley Maclaine, actress
- Dean Martin, singer (Republican)
- Lee Marvin, actor
- Dina Merrill, actress
- Marilyn Monroe, actress
- Kim Novak, actress
- Vincent Price, actor
- Edward G. Robinson, actor
- Mort Sahl, comedian
- Frank Sinatra, singer
- Pat Suzuki, singer

== See also ==
- Robert F. Kennedy 1968 presidential campaign
- Ted Kennedy 1980 presidential campaign
- Robert F. Kennedy Jr. 2024 presidential campaign

== Works cited ==
- Black, Earl; Black, Merle (1992). The Vital South: How Presidents Are Elected. Harvard University Press. ISBN 0674941306.
- Dudley, Robert L.; Shiraev, Eric (2008). Counting Every Vote: The Most Contentious Elections in American History. Dulles, VA: Potomac Books. ISBN 978-1-59797-224-6.
- Gellman, Irwin (2021). Campaign of the Century: Kennedy, Nixon, and the Election of 1960. Yale University Press. ISBN 9780300218268.
- Kallina, Edmund (1985). "Was the 1960 Presidential Election Stolen? The Case of Illinois". Presidential Studies Quarterly. 15 (1). Wiley-Blackwell: 113–118. JSTOR 27550168.
- Reeves, Richard (1993). President Kennedy: Profile of Power. New York: Simon & Schuster. ISBN 978-0-671-64879-4.
