= Robert Troutman Jr. =

American lawyer (1918–1991)

- Born: Robert Battey Troutman Jr. February 20, 1918; Atlanta, Georgia, U.S.
- Died: July 30, 1991 (aged 73); Atlanta, Georgia, U.S.
- Education: University of Georgia (BA); Harvard Law School (LLB)
- Occupation: Lawyer
- Political party: Democratic
- Spouse: Lois Lorraine Dessez (m. 1945)
- Children: 3

Robert Battey Troutman Jr. (February 20, 1918 – July 30, 1991) was an American lawyer from Atlanta. He attended Harvard Law School, where he was roommates with Joseph P. Kennedy Jr. After a time working for his father's law firm, Spalding, Sibley, Troutman, and Brock (later King & Spalding), he served as an aide to John F. Kennedy. Earning a reputation for his strong support of civil rights, Troutman was Southern campaign manager for Kennedy's 1960 presidential campaign and, after the election, was appointed to the President's Committee on Equal Employment Opportunity, the forerunner to the Equal Employment Opportunity Commission.
