= 1960 Democratic Party vice presidential candidate selection =

1960 Democratic vice presidential nomination
- July 13, 1960
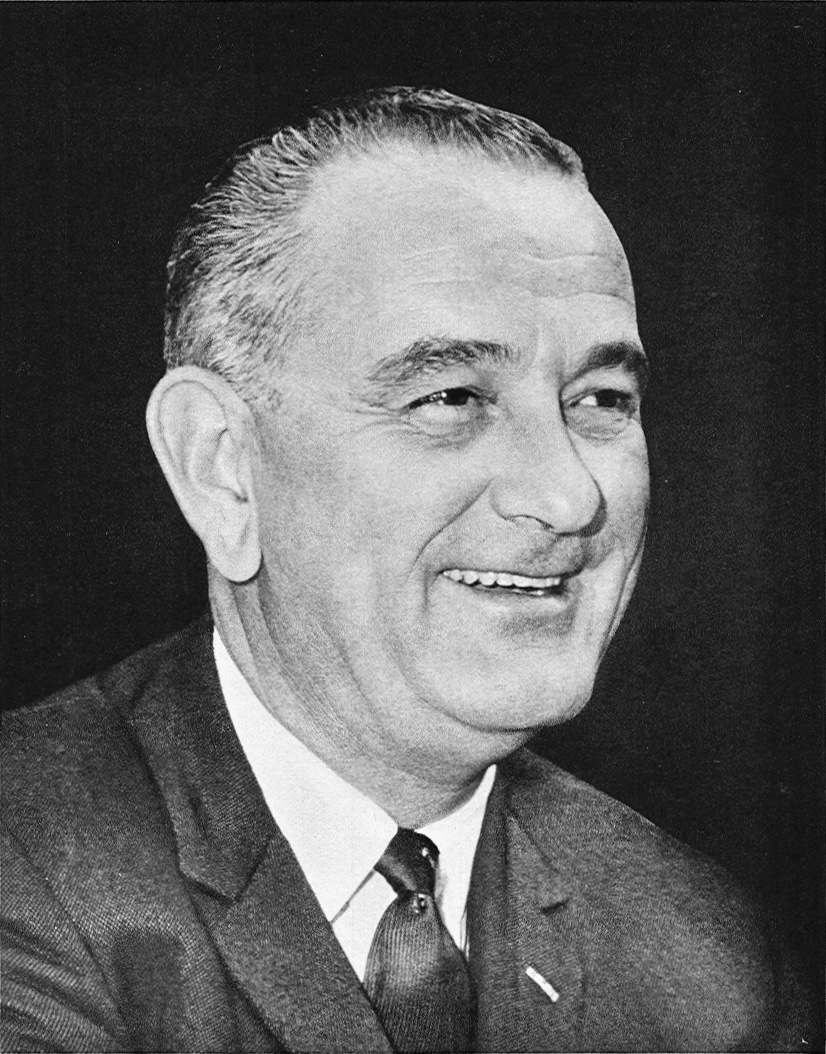
Nominee	Lyndon B. Johnson
Home state	Texas
Previous Vice Presidential nominee
Estes Kefauver
Vice Presidential nominee
Lyndon B. Johnson

The selection of the Democratic Party's vice presidential candidate for the 1960 United States presidential election occurred at the party's national convention on July 14, 1960. After winning the presidential nomination on the first ballot of the 1960 Democratic National Convention, Massachusetts Senator John F. Kennedy turned his attention to picking a running mate. Kennedy chose Senate Majority Leader Lyndon B. Johnson, who had finished second on the presidential ballot, as his running mate. Johnson, a Protestant Texan, provided geographical and religious balance to a ticket led by a Catholic Northeasterner, but many liberals did not like the pick. Many were surprised both that Kennedy made the offer and that Johnson accepted the offer, as the two had been rivals for the 1960 presidential nomination. Some accounts had it that Kennedy had offered the position to Johnson as a courtesy and expected Johnson to decline the offer, and that when Johnson accepted, Kennedy sent his brother, Robert F. Kennedy, to talk Johnson out of accepting the offer. But Johnson biographer Robert Caro concluded that RFK was not acting on orders from JFK, who only authorized his brother to let Johnson know that there might be a floor fight over the nomination and give him the opportunity to demur.

However, Kennedy may have made the offer in earnest due to Johnson's appeal in the South, Johnson's friendly relationship with Speaker of the House Sam Rayburn, and Kennedy's desire to remove Johnson as Senate Majority Leader in favor of the more liberal Mike Mansfield. Regardless, Johnson decided that accepting the offer would be better for his political career and better position himself to become president, and so he chose to become Kennedy's running mate. The Democratic convention confirmed Johnson as the vice presidential nominee, although the delegation from Washington, D.C. attempted to select Minnesota Governor Orville Freeman instead.

== Historical perspective ==
Seymour Hersh stated that Robert F. Kennedy (known as Bobby) hated Johnson for his attacks on the Kennedy family, and later maintained that his brother offered the position to Johnson merely as a courtesy, expecting him to decline. Arthur M. Schlesinger Jr. concurred with Robert Kennedy's version of events, and put forth that John Kennedy would have preferred Stuart Symington as his running-mate, alleging that Johnson teamed with House Speaker Sam Rayburn and pressured Kennedy to favor Johnson. Robert Kennedy wanted his brother to choose labor leader Walter Reuther.

Caro offered a different perspective; he wrote that the Kennedy campaign was desperate to win what was forecast to be a very close election against Richard Nixon and Henry Cabot Lodge Jr. Johnson was needed on the ticket to help carry Texas and the Southern states. Caro's research showed that on July 14, John Kennedy started the process while Johnson was still asleep. At 6:30 am, John Kennedy asked Robert Kennedy to prepare an estimate of upcoming electoral votes "including Texas". Robert called Pierre Salinger and Kenneth O'Donnell to assist him. Salinger realized the ramifications of counting Texas votes as their own and asked him whether he was considering a Kennedy–Johnson ticket, and Robert replied "yes". Caro contends that it was then that John Kennedy called Johnson to arrange a meeting; he also called Pennsylvania governor David L. Lawrence, a Johnson backer, to request that he nominate Johnson for vice president if Johnson were to accept the role. According to Caro, Kennedy and Johnson met and Johnson said that Kennedy would have trouble with Kennedy supporters who were anti-Johnson. Kennedy returned to his suite to announce the Kennedy–Johnson ticket to his closest supporters, including northern political bosses. O'Donnell was angry at what he considered a betrayal by Kennedy, who had previously cast Johnson as anti-labor and anti-liberal. Afterward, Robert Kennedy visited labor leaders who were extremely unhappy with the choice of Johnson and, after seeing the depth of labor opposition to Johnson, Robert ran messages between the hotel suites of his brother and Johnson—apparently trying to undermine the proposed ticket without John Kennedy's authorization.

Caro wrote that Robert Kennedy tried to get Johnson to agree to be the Democratic Party chairman rather than the vice president. Johnson refused to accept a change in plans unless it came directly from John Kennedy. Despite his brother's interference, John Kennedy was firm that Johnson was who he wanted as running mate; he met with staffers such as Larry O'Brien, his national campaign manager, to say that Johnson was to be vice president. O'Brien recalled later that John Kennedy's words were wholly unexpected, but that after a brief consideration of the electoral vote situation, he thought "it was a stroke of genius". When John and Robert Kennedy next saw their father Joe Kennedy, he told them that signing Johnson as running mate was the smartest thing they had ever done.

Another account of how Johnson's nomination came about was told by Evelyn Lincoln, JFK's secretary (both before and during his presidency). In 1993, in a videotaped interview, she described how the decision was made, stating she was the only witness to a private meeting between John and Robert Kennedy in a suite at the Biltmore Hotel where they made the decision. She said she went in and out of the room as they spoke and, while she was in the room, heard them say that Johnson had tried to blackmail JFK into offering him the vice-presidential nomination with evidence of his womanizing provided by FBI director J. Edgar Hoover. She also overheard them discuss possible ways to avoid making the offer, and ultimately conclude that JFK had no choice.

== Outcome ==
The Kennedy–Johnson ticket narrowly defeated incumbent Vice President Richard Nixon and his running mate, former Massachusetts Senator Henry Cabot Lodge, in the 1960 election. Coincidental to the presidential election, Johnson was re-elected for a third term as a Senator from Texas but did not take office. Johnson became President in 1963 following the assassination of Kennedy and was re-elected to a full term in 1964 in his own right.

== Potential running mates ==
=== Finalists ===
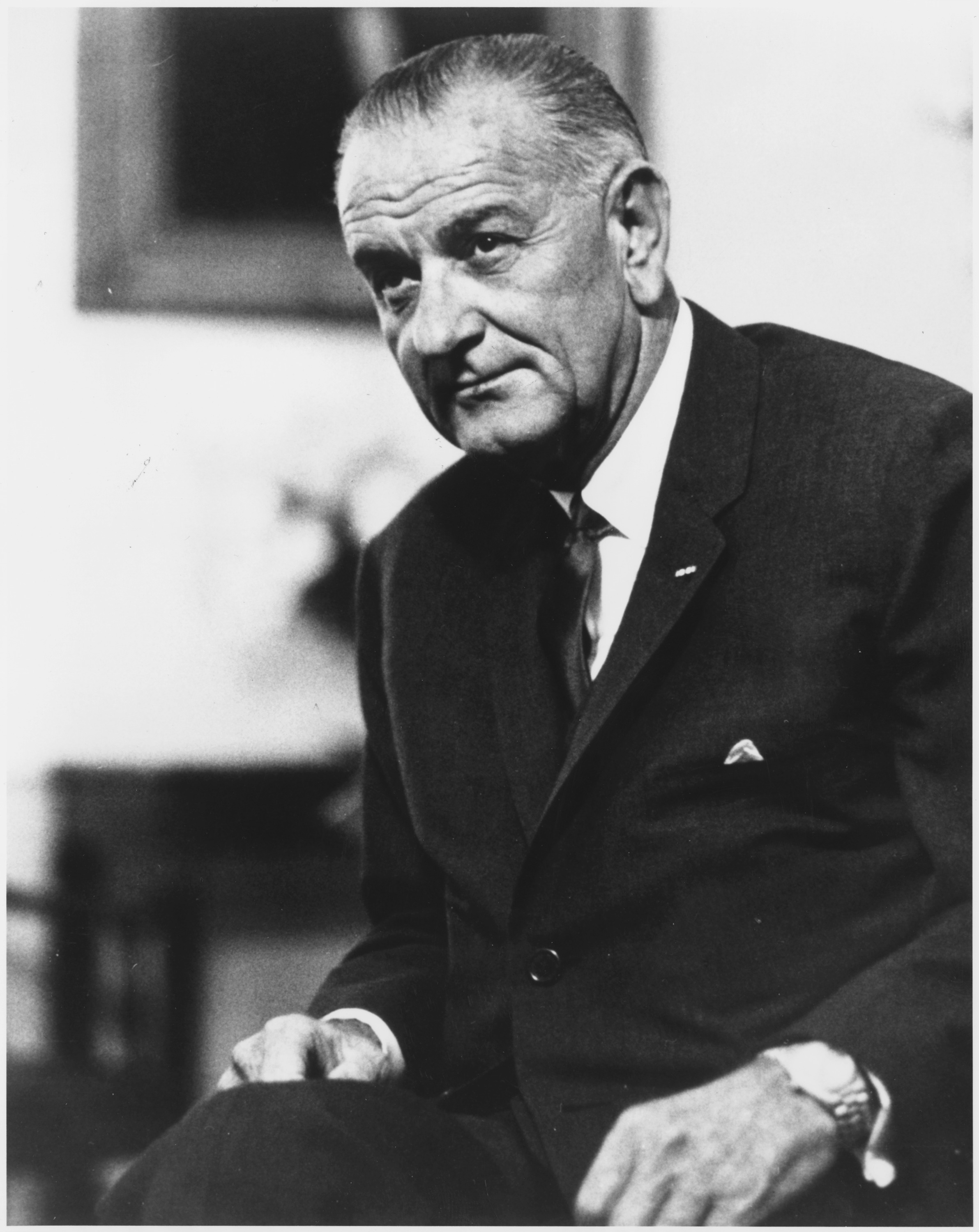
Senator and 1960 presidential candidate
Lyndon B. Johnson
of Texas
(1949–1961)

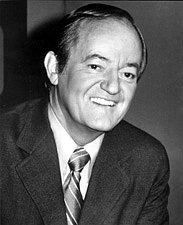
Senator and 1960 presidential candidate
Hubert Humphrey
of Minnesota
(1949–1964; 1971–1978)

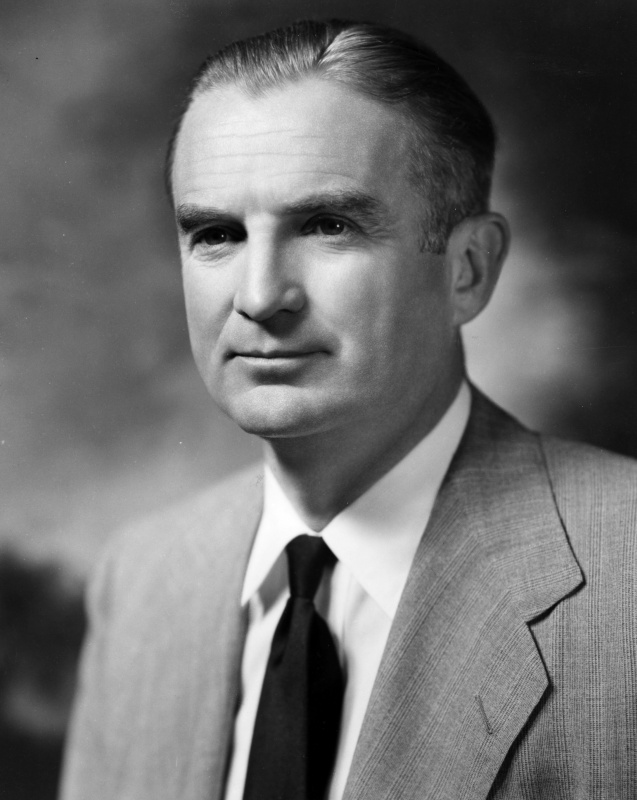
Senator
Stuart Symington
of Missouri
(1953–1976)

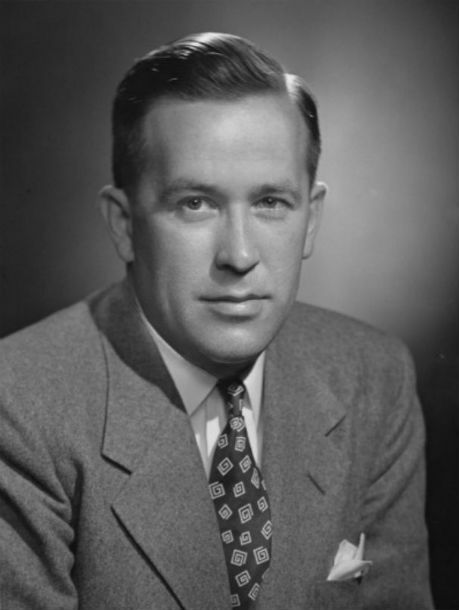
Senator
Henry M. Jackson
of Washington
(1953–1983)

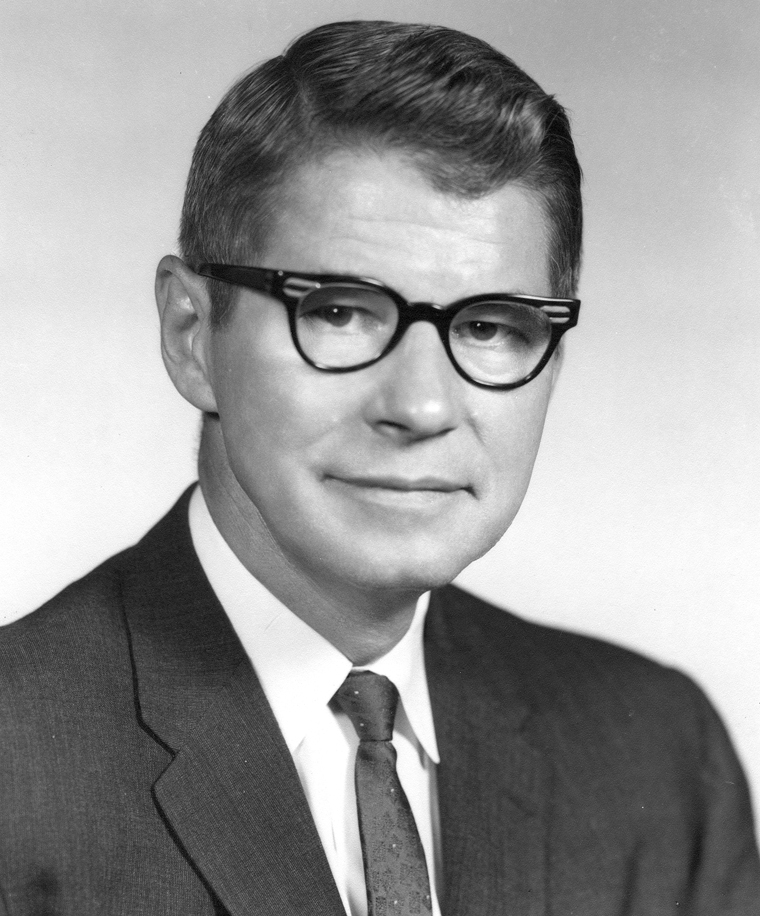
Governor
Orville Freeman
of Minnesota
(1955–1961)

=== Others ===
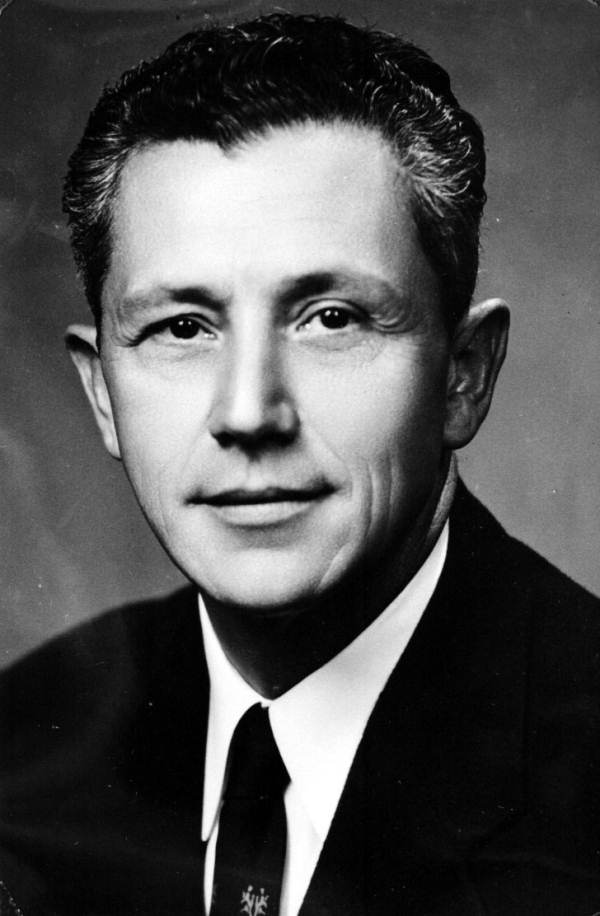
Governor
LeRoy Collins
of Florida
(1955–1961)

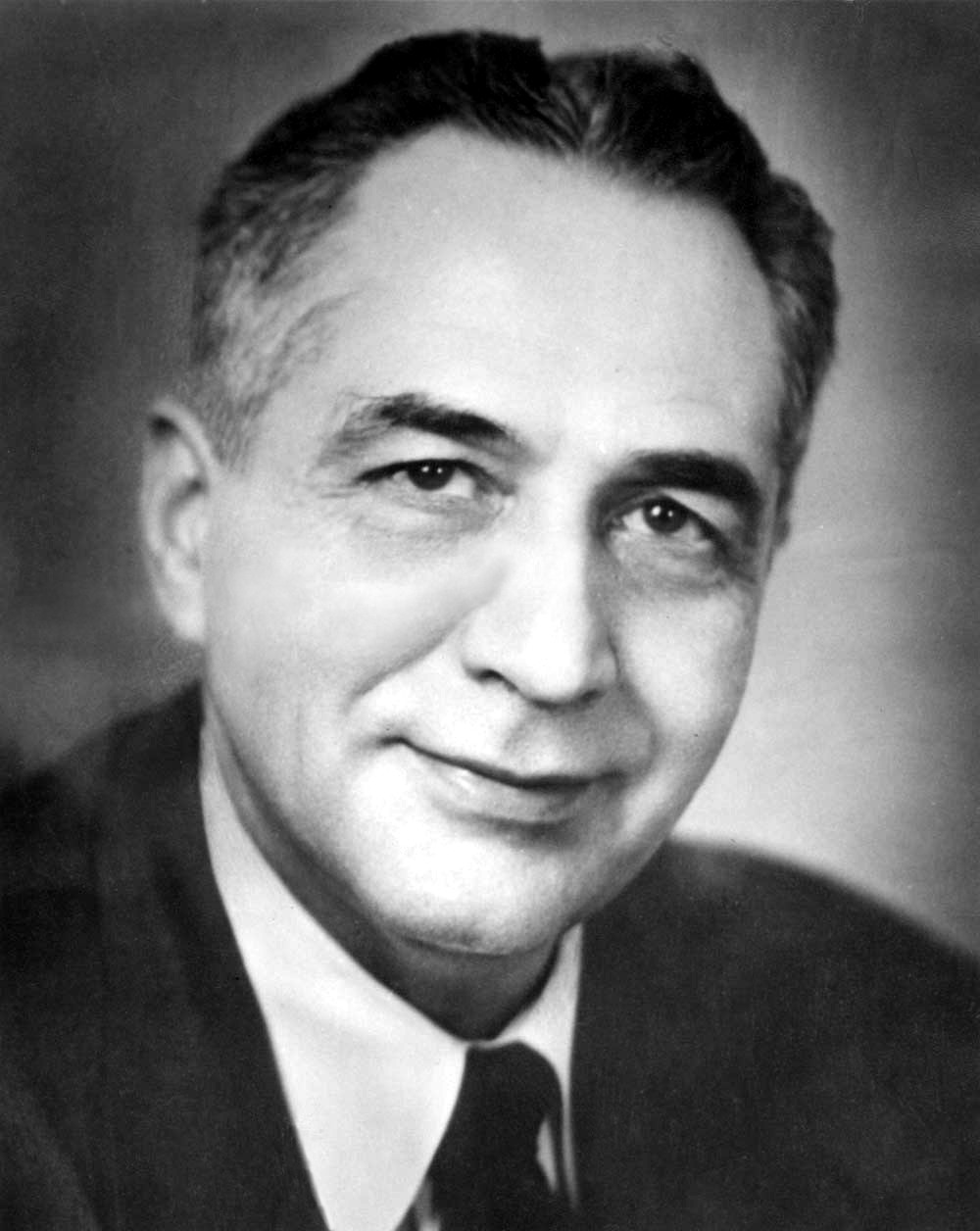
Governor
George Docking
of Kansas
(1957–1961)

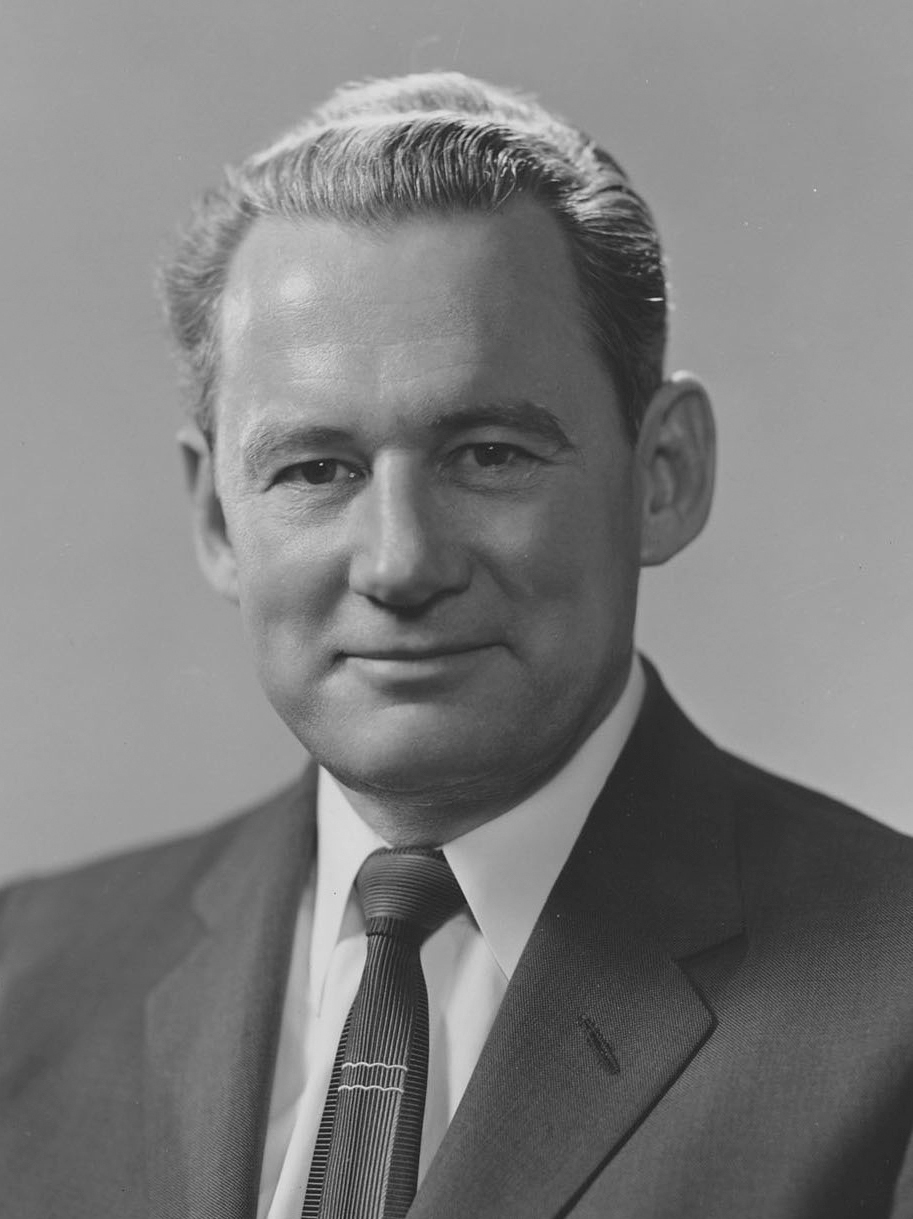
Senator
Clair Engle
of California
(1959–1964)

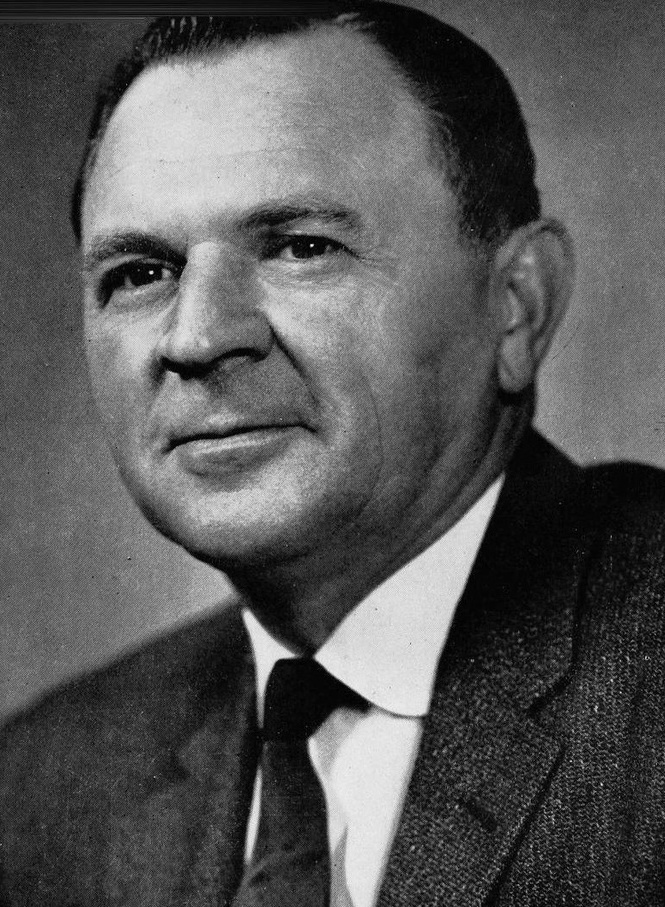
Governor
Herschel C. Loveless
of Iowa
(1957–1961)

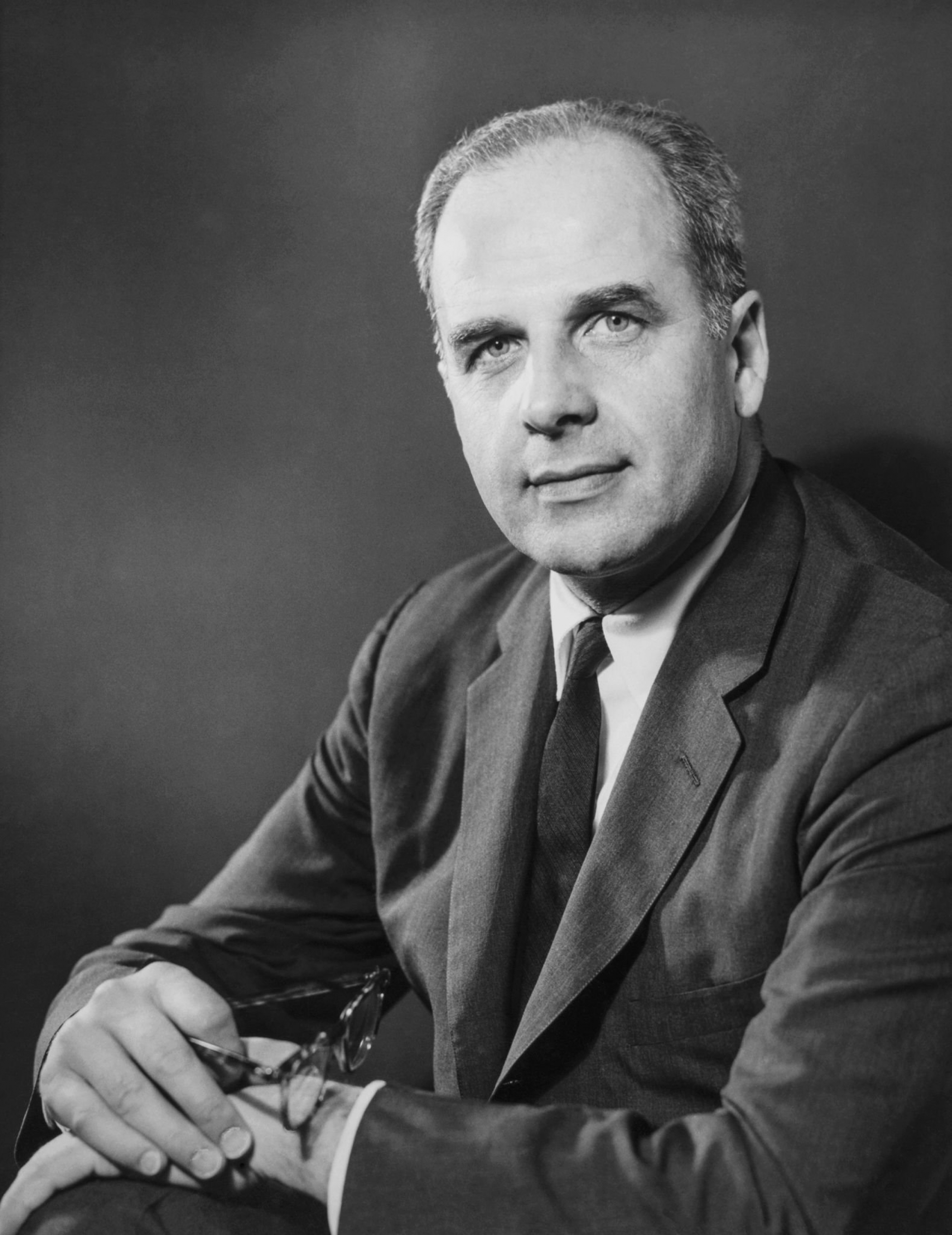
Governor
Gaylord Nelson
of Wisconsin
(1959–1963)

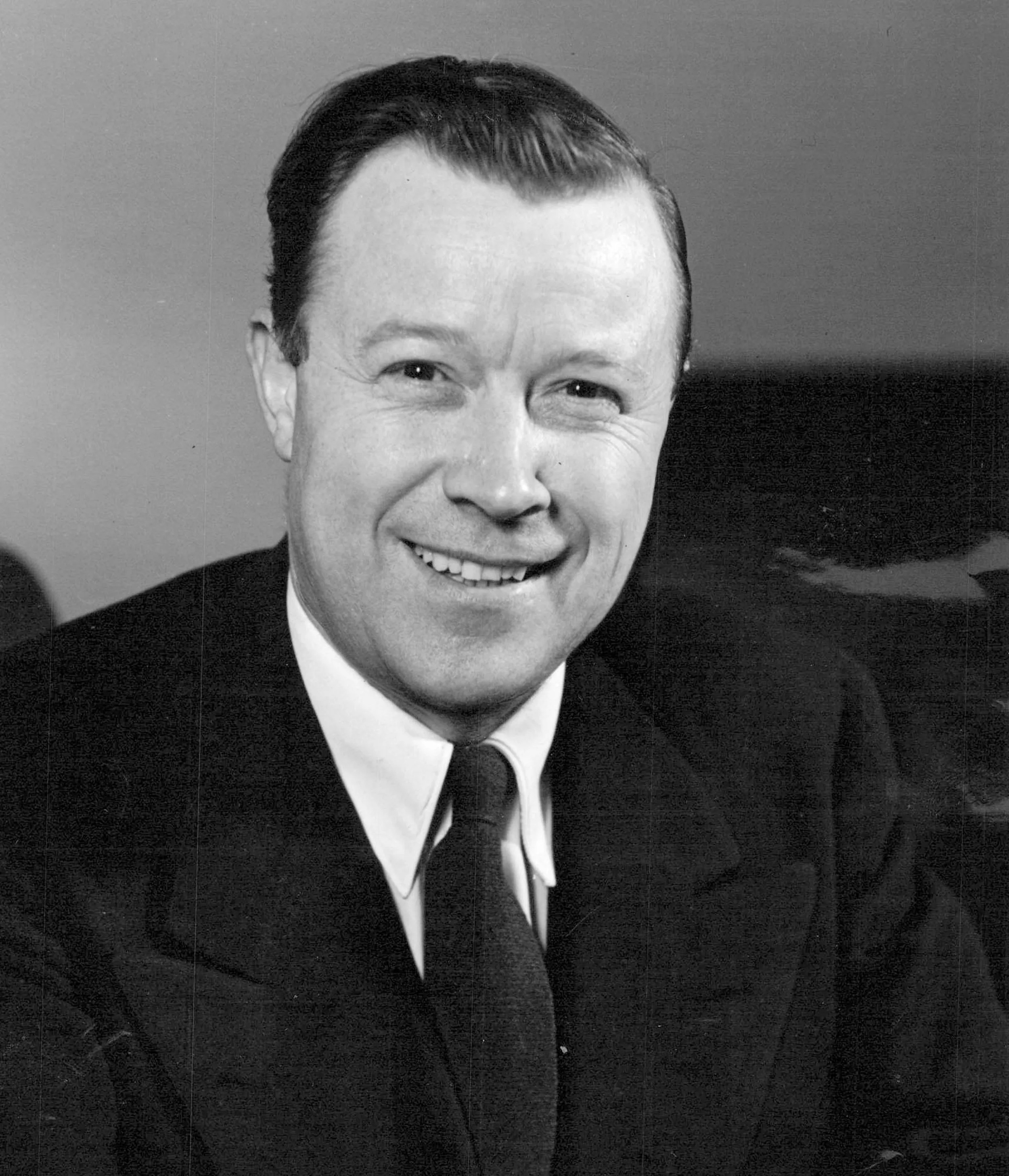
President of the United Automobile Workers
Walter Reuther
from Michigan
(1946–1970)

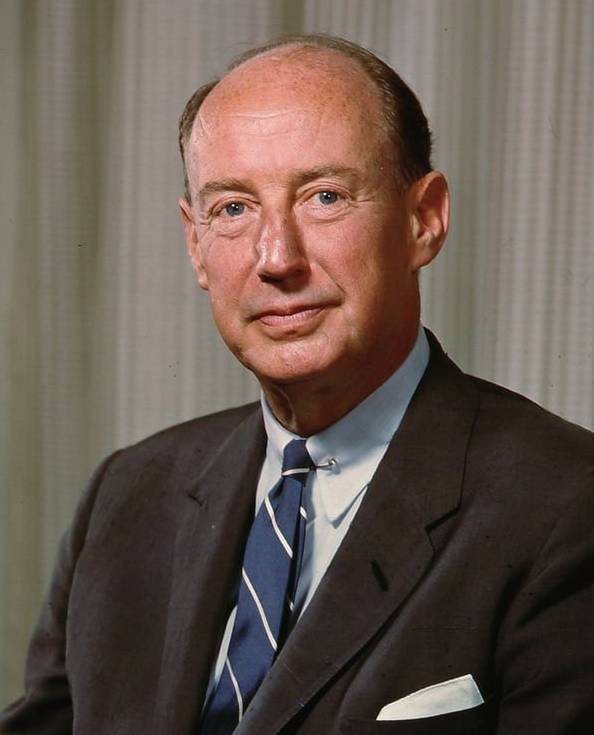
Former Governor and 1952/1956 presidential nominee
Adlai Stevenson II
of Illinois
(1949–1953)

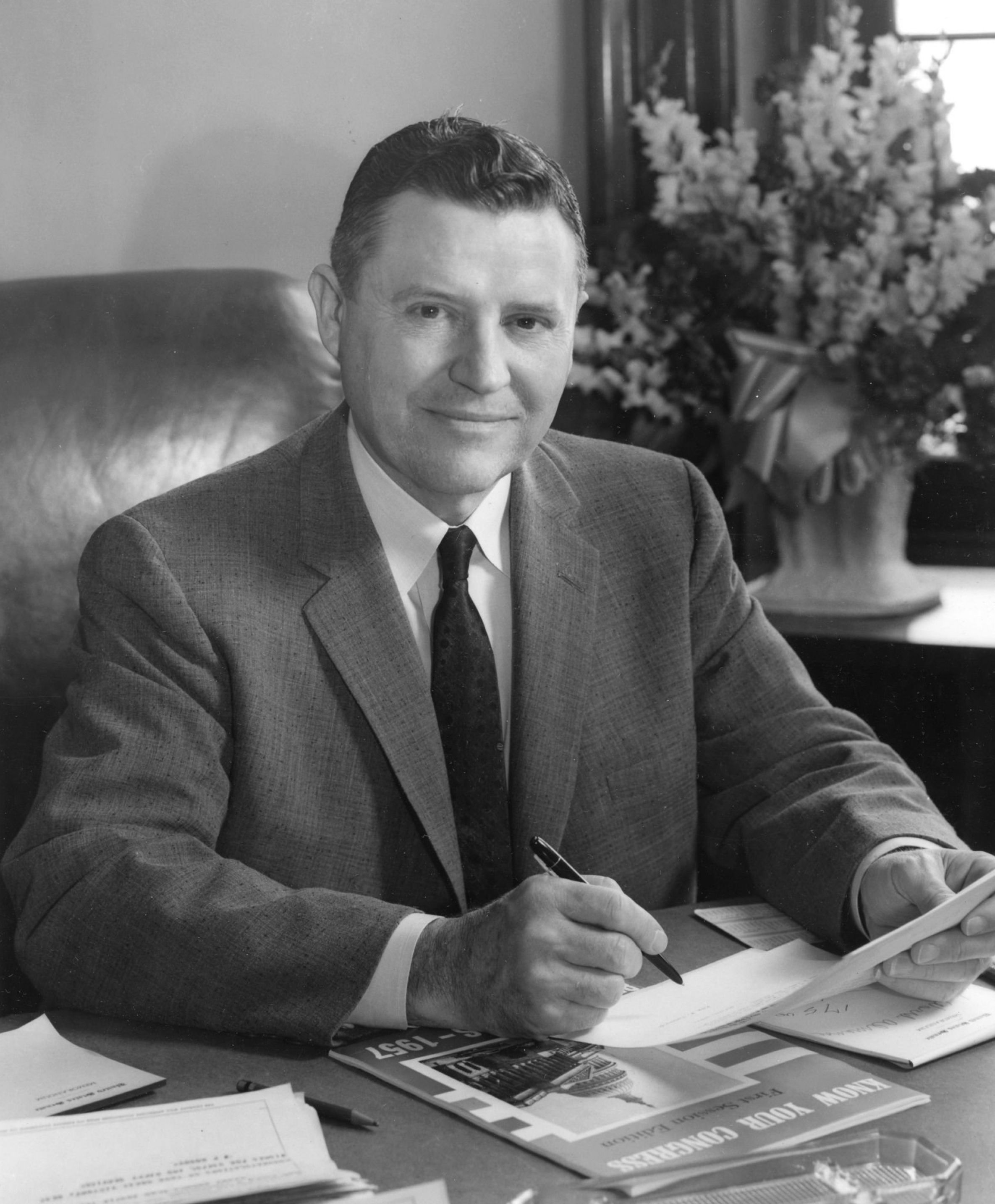
Senator
Ralph Yarborough
from Texas
(1957–1971)

== See also ==
- 1960 Democratic National Convention
- 1960 Democratic Party presidential primaries
