= Hyannis Armory =

- Part of Massachusetts National Guard
- Hyannis, Massachusetts

Site information
- Type: Armory
- Owner: Barnstable, Massachusetts
- Controlled by: Town of Barnstable
- Open to the public: Yes

Location
- Coordinates: 41°39′02.85″N 70°16′57.62″W

Site history
- Built: 1958
- Built by: Massachusetts National Guard
- In use: 1958-2005
- Battles/wars: Cold War
- Events: JFK's Presidential Acceptance Speech

Garrison information
- Garrison: Hyannis, Massachusetts
- Occupants: 685th AAA Machine Gun Battalion

- Hyannis National Guard Armory Battery D of the 685th AAA Battalion
- U.S. National Register of Historic Places
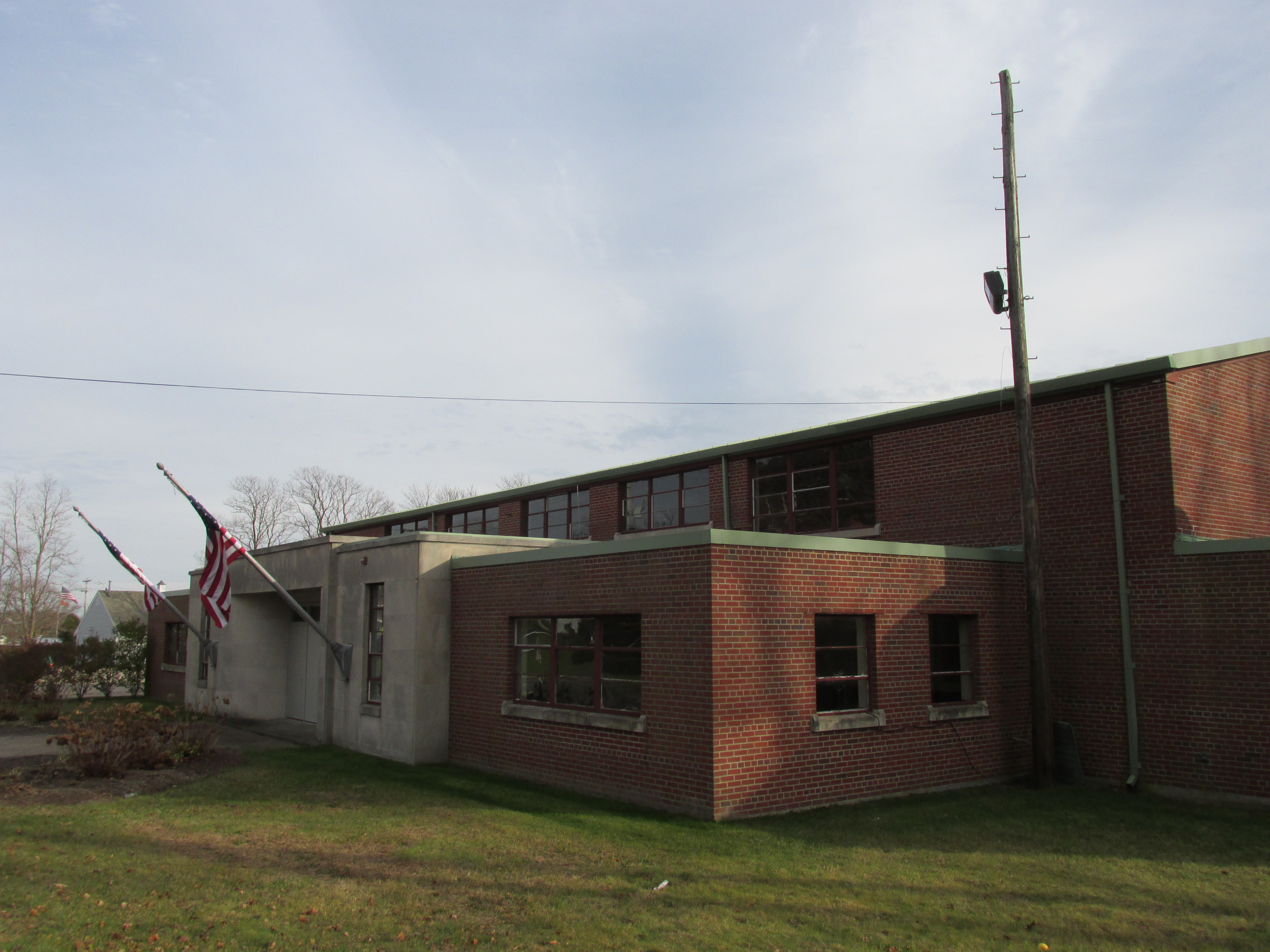
- Hyannis Armory

- Location within Cape Cod Location within Massachusetts Location within the United States
- Coordinates: 41°39′2.93″N 70°16′59.50″W
- Built: 1958
- MPS: Barnstable MRA
- NRHP reference No.: 87000278

The Hyannis Armory is located at 225 South Street, Hyannis, Massachusetts. The armory was built in 1958, and hosted Battery D of the 685th AAA Machine Gun Battalion of the Massachusetts Army National Guard. President-elect John F. Kennedy gave his victory speech at the Hyannis Armory on Nov. 9, 1960, the morning he learned he had been elected. The property was nominated for the National Register of Historic Places, but was never listed.

In the late 2000s, there was talk of demolishing the armory and building a new performing arts center, which would be the second for the town, the first being the Barnstable High School Performing Arts Center at nearby Barnstable High School. Sturgis Charter School's basketball team used to practice within the facility and the lack of heat has sometimes led to temperatures inside being colder than those outside. The plan to tear down the facility and replace it was shelved when the economy collapsed in 2008. Hyannis Armory is currently part of the Kennedy Legacy Trail and is open to the public.
