= 1960 Democratic National Convention =

U.S. political event held in Los Angeles, California

- 1960 presidential election
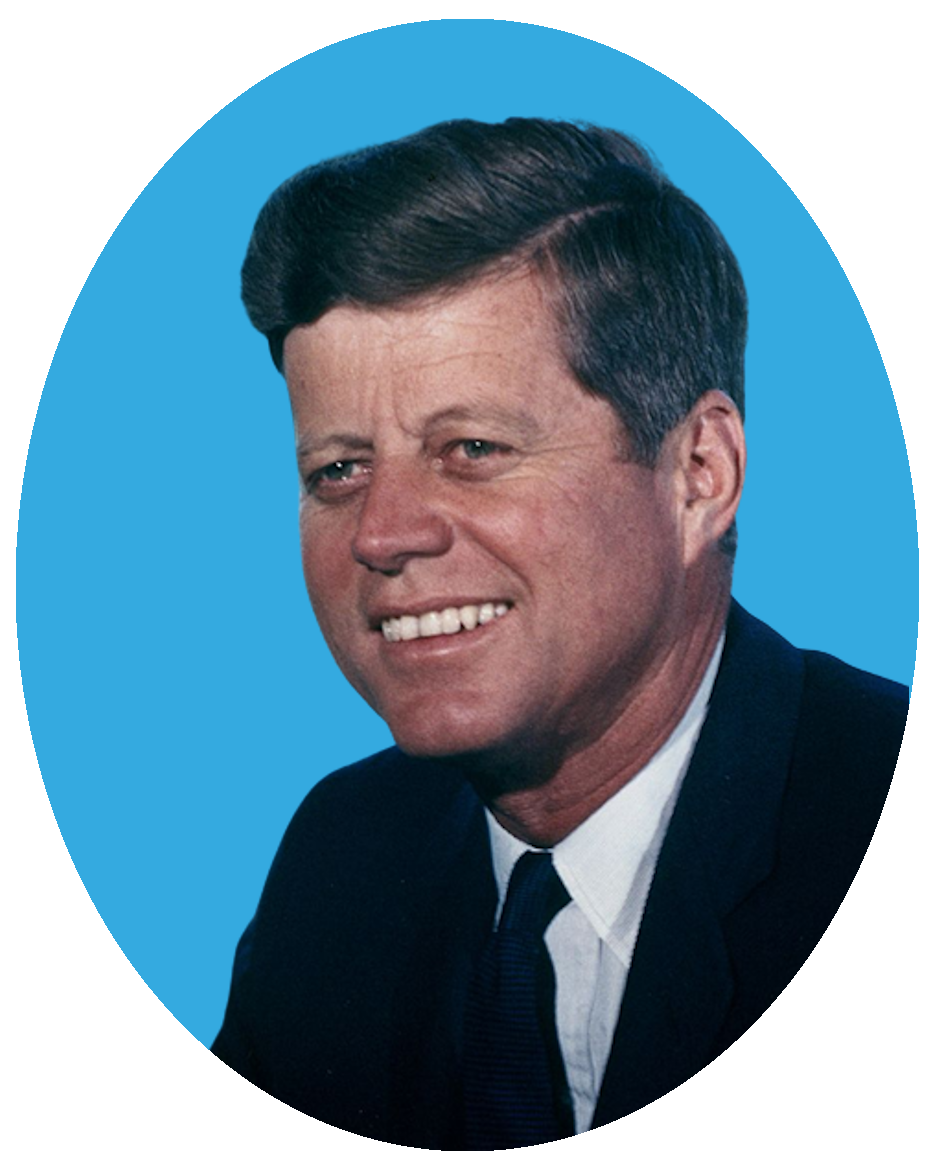
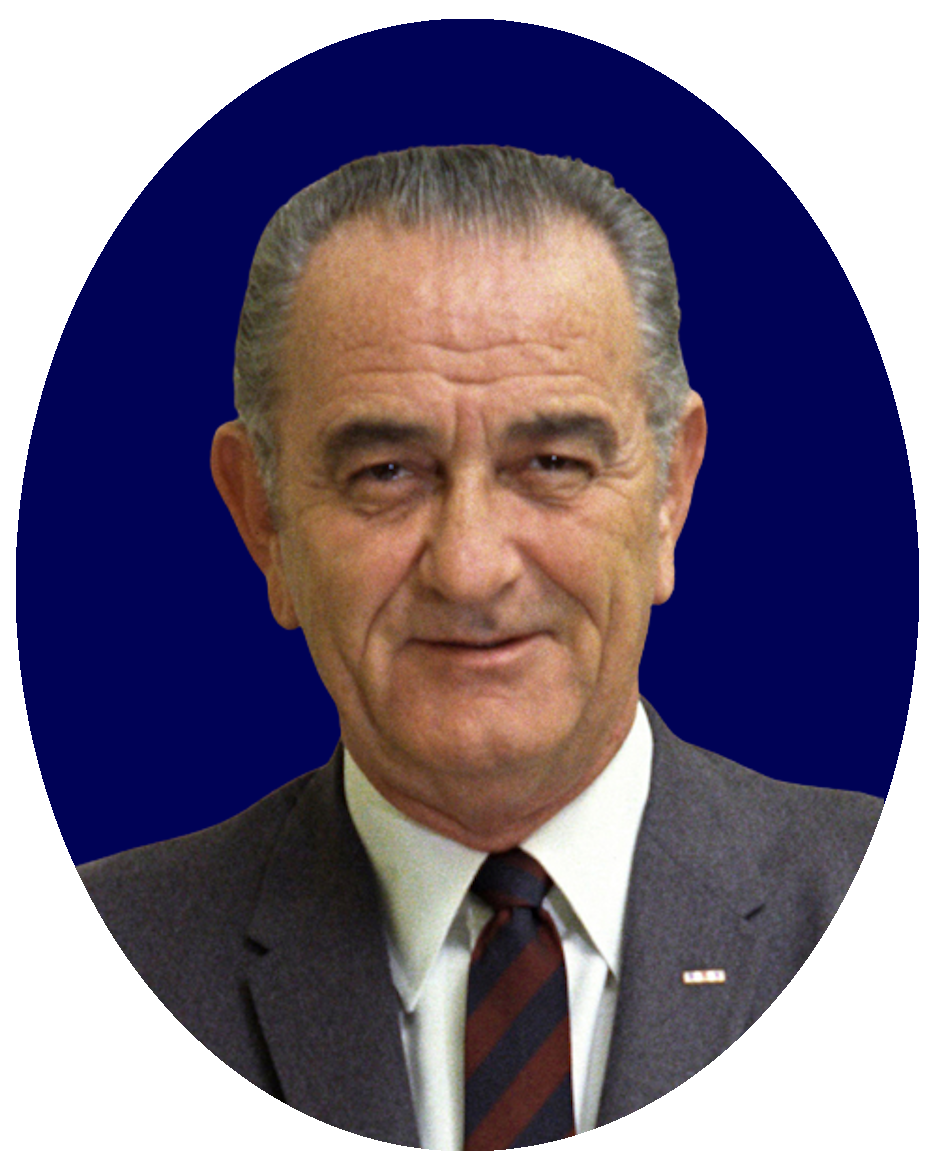
- Nominees; Kennedy and Johnson

Convention
- Dates: July 11–15, 1960
- City: Los Angeles, California
- Venue: Los Angeles Memorial Sports Arena and Los Angeles Memorial Coliseum
- Keynote speaker: Sen. Frank Church of Idaho

Candidates
- Presidential nominee: John F. Kennedy of Massachusetts
- Vice-presidential nominee: Lyndon B. Johnson of Texas

The 1960 Democratic National Convention was held in Los Angeles, California, on July 11–15, 1960. It nominated Senator John F. Kennedy of Massachusetts for president and Senate Majority Leader Lyndon B. Johnson of Texas for vice president.

In the general election that November, the Kennedy–Johnson ticket won an electoral college victory and a narrow popular vote plurality (slightly over 110,000 nationally) over the Republican candidates Vice President Richard M. Nixon and UN Ambassador Henry C. Lodge II.

Due to its size, the Biltmore Hotel was selected to serve as the headquarters hotel for the Democratic National Committee. It also housed command-posts for the campaigns of the various candidates seeking the nomination, temporary studio spaces for the television networks, and workspaces for select print journalists.

== Prologue ==
The major candidates for the 1960 Democratic presidential nomination were Kennedy, Governor Pat Brown of California, Senator Stuart Symington of Missouri, Senator Lyndon B. Johnson of Texas, former Illinois Governor Adlai Stevenson, Senator Wayne Morse of Oregon, and Senator Hubert Humphrey of Minnesota. Several other candidates sought support in their home state or region as "favorite son" candidates without any realistic chance of winning the nomination. Symington, Stevenson, and Johnson all declined to campaign in the presidential primaries. While this reduced their potential delegate count going into the Democratic National Convention, each of these three candidates hoped that the other leading contenders would stumble in the primaries, thus causing the convention's delegates to choose him as a "compromise" candidate acceptable to all factions of the party.

The 1958 re-election defeat of New York governor Averell Harriman all but assured that he was no longer a prospective contender for the nomination (while also elevating his successful challenger Nelson Rockefeller as a prospective Republican contender). Contrarily, Pat Brown's heavy victory over Senator William F. Knowland in the 1958 California gubernatorial election earned Brown some discussion as a prospective contender for the Democratic nomination and destroyed Senator Knowland's chances at the Republican nomination.

Kennedy was initially dogged by suggestions from some Democratic Party elders (such as former President Harry S. Truman, who was supporting Symington) that he was too youthful and inexperienced to be president; these critics suggested that he should agree to be the running mate for another Democrat. Realizing that this was a strategy touted by his opponents to keep the public from taking him seriously, Kennedy stated frankly, "I'm not running for vice-president, I'm running for president." Truman later refused to attend the convention, claiming it was "rigged" to force Kennedy's nomination on the party.

Kennedy's Roman Catholic religion was an issue in the primaries. Kennedy first challenged Minnesota Senator Hubert Humphrey in the Wisconsin primary and defeated him. Kennedy's sisters, brothers, and wife Jacqueline combed the state looking for votes, leading Humphrey to complain that he "felt like an independent merchant competing against a chain store." However, some political experts argued that Kennedy's margin of victory had come almost entirely from Catholic areas, and thus Humphrey decided to continue the contest in the heavily Protestant state of West Virginia. The first televised debate of 1960 was held in West Virginia, and Kennedy outperformed Humphrey. Humphrey's campaign was low on funds and could not compete for advertising and other "get-out-the-vote" drives with Kennedy's well-financed and well-organized campaign. In the end, Kennedy defeated Humphrey with over 60% of the vote, and Humphrey ended his presidential campaign. West Virginia showed that Kennedy, a Catholic, could win in a heavily Protestant state.

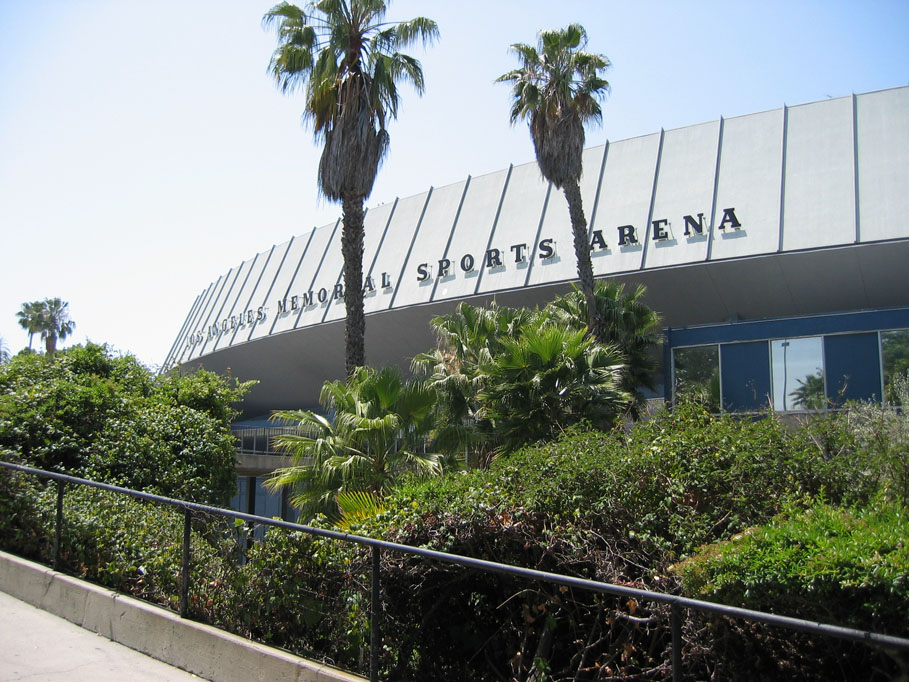
The Los Angeles Memorial Sports Arena (pictured in 2007) was the site of the 1960 Democratic National Convention

Although Kennedy had only competed in ten presidential primaries, Kennedy's rivals, Johnson and Symington, failed to campaign in any primaries. Even though Stevenson had twice been the Democratic Party's presidential candidate and retained a loyal following of liberals, especially in California, his two landslide defeats to Republican Dwight Eisenhower led most party leaders and delegates to search for a "fresh face" who could win a national election. Following the primaries, Kennedy traveled around the nation speaking to state delegations and their leaders. As the Democratic Convention opened, Kennedy was far in the lead, but was still seen as being just short of the delegate total he needed to win.

In the week before the convention opened, Kennedy received two new challengers when Lyndon B. Johnson, the powerful Senate Majority Leader from Texas, and Adlai Stevenson II, the party's nominee in 1952 and 1956, announced their candidacies. Johnson challenged Kennedy to a televised debate before a joint meeting of the Texas and Massachusetts delegations; Kennedy accepted. Most observers felt that Kennedy won the debate, and Johnson was not able to expand his delegate support beyond the South.

Two Johnson supporters, including John B. Connally, brought up the question of Kennedy's health. Connally said that Kennedy had Addison's disease. JFK's press secretary Pierre Salinger denied the story. A Kennedy physician, Janet Travell, released a statement that the senator's adrenal glands were functioning adequately and that he was no more susceptible to infection than anyone else. It was also denied that Kennedy was on cortisone.

== Platform ==
The Democratic platform in 1960 was the longest yet. It called for a loosening of tight economic policy: "We Democrats believe that the economy can and must grow at an average rate of 5 percent annually, almost twice as fast as our annual rate since 1953...As the first step in speeding economic growth, a Democratic president will put an end to the present high-interest-rate, tight-money policy."

Other planks included national defense, disarmament, civil rights, immigration, foreign aid, the economy, labor and tax reform. Senator Sam Ervin of North Carolina attempted to soften the party's plank on civil rights. A speech by Hawaii delegate Patsy Mink persuaded two-thirds of the party to keep their progressive stance on the issue.

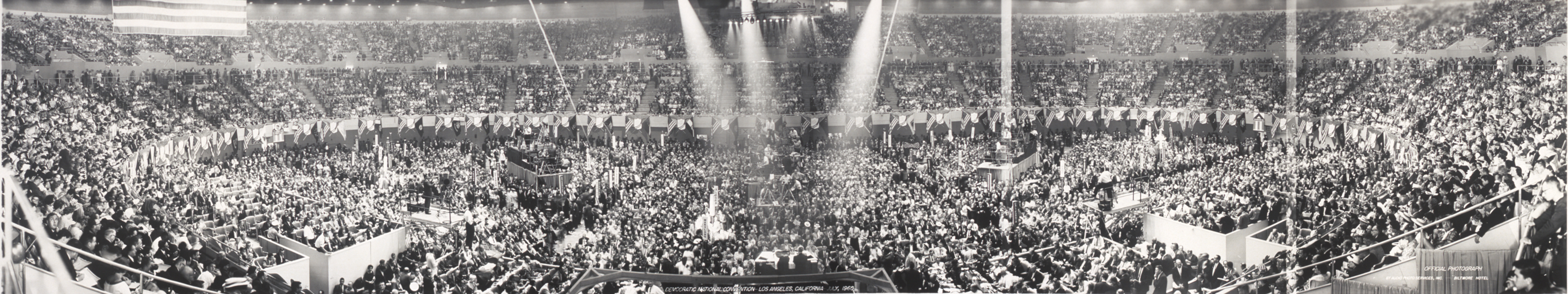

== Presidential nomination ==
=== Presidential candidates ===
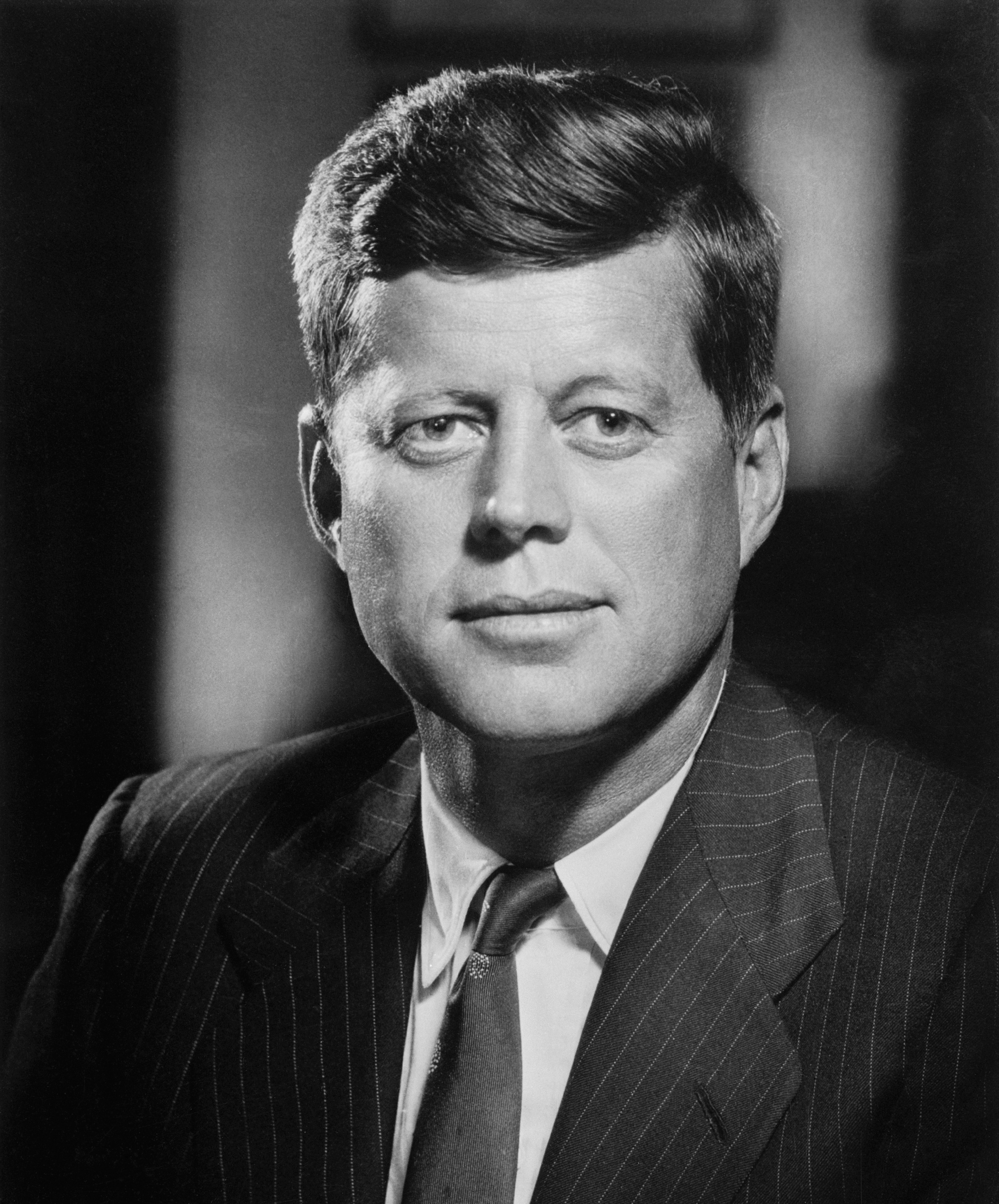
Senator
John F. Kennedy
of Massachusetts

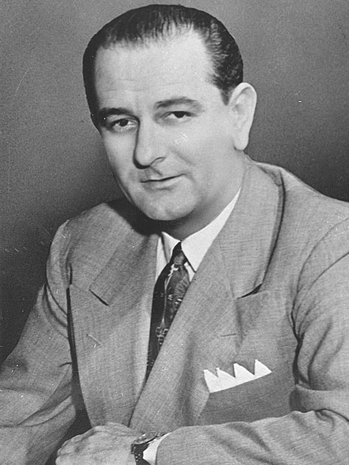
Senate Majority Leader
Lyndon B. Johnson
of Texas

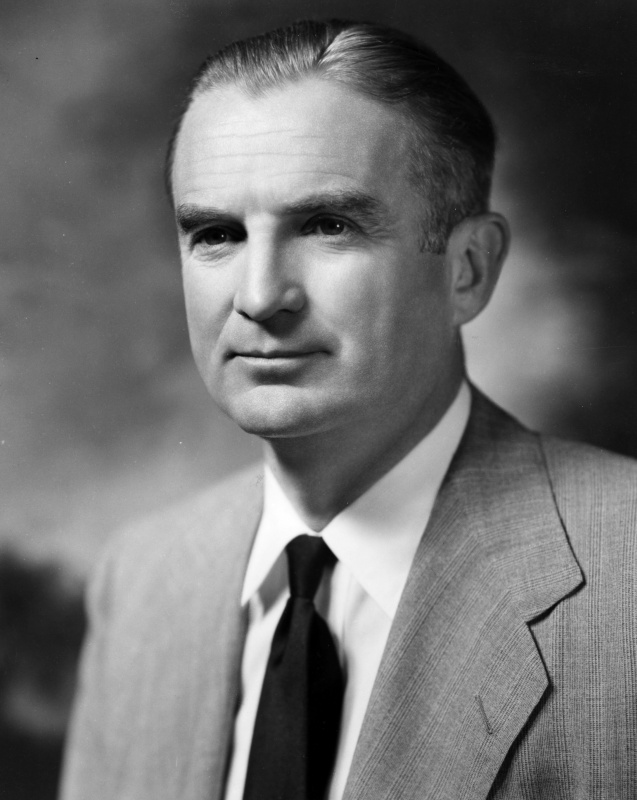
Senator
Stuart Symington
of Missouri

Former Governor
Adlai Stevenson
of Illinois

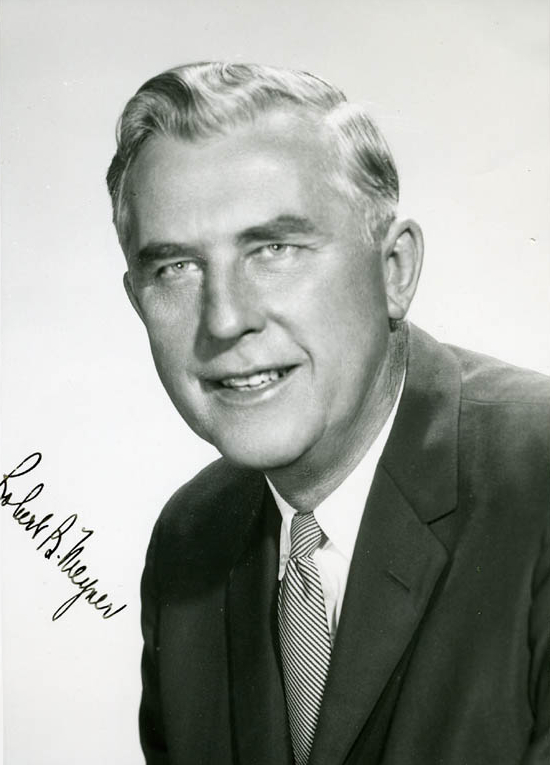
Governor
Robert B. Meyner
of New Jersey

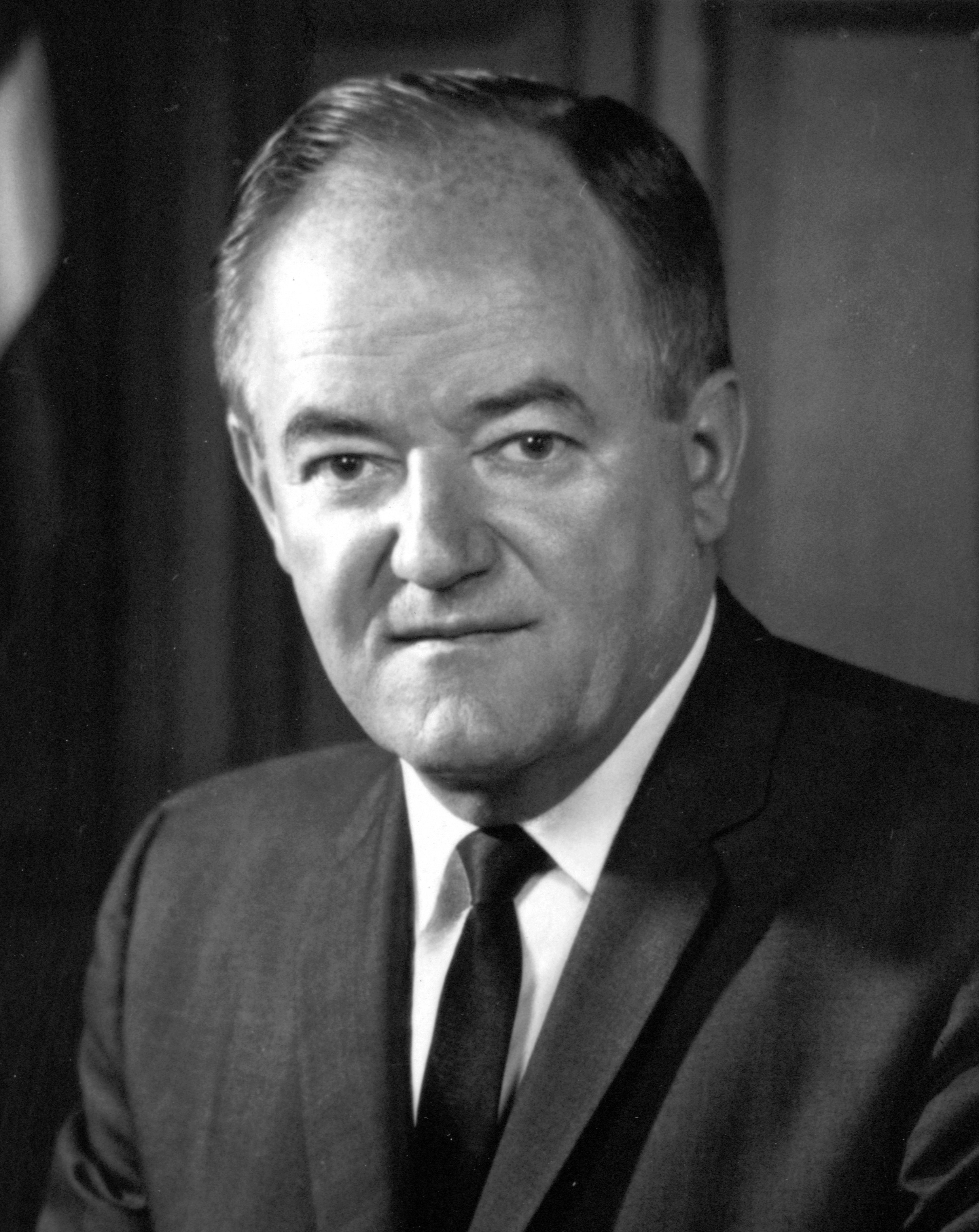
Senator
Hubert Humphrey
of Minnesota

On July 13, 1960, the third day of the convention, Kennedy gained a narrow majority on the first ballot, with campaign manager Robert F. Kennedy securing critical delegates at the last minute. The final tally was:

Presidential Balloting
Candidate	1st	Percentage
Kennedy	806	52.99%
Johnson	409	26.89%
Symington	86	5.65%
Stevenson	79.5	5.23%
Meyner	43	2.83%
Humphrey	41.5	2.73%
Smathers	30	1.97%
Barnett	23	1.51%
Loveless	1.5	0.10%
Brown	0.5	0.03%
Faubus	0.5	0.03%
Rosellini	0.5	0.03%

Presidential Balloting / 3rd Day of Convention (July 13, 1960)

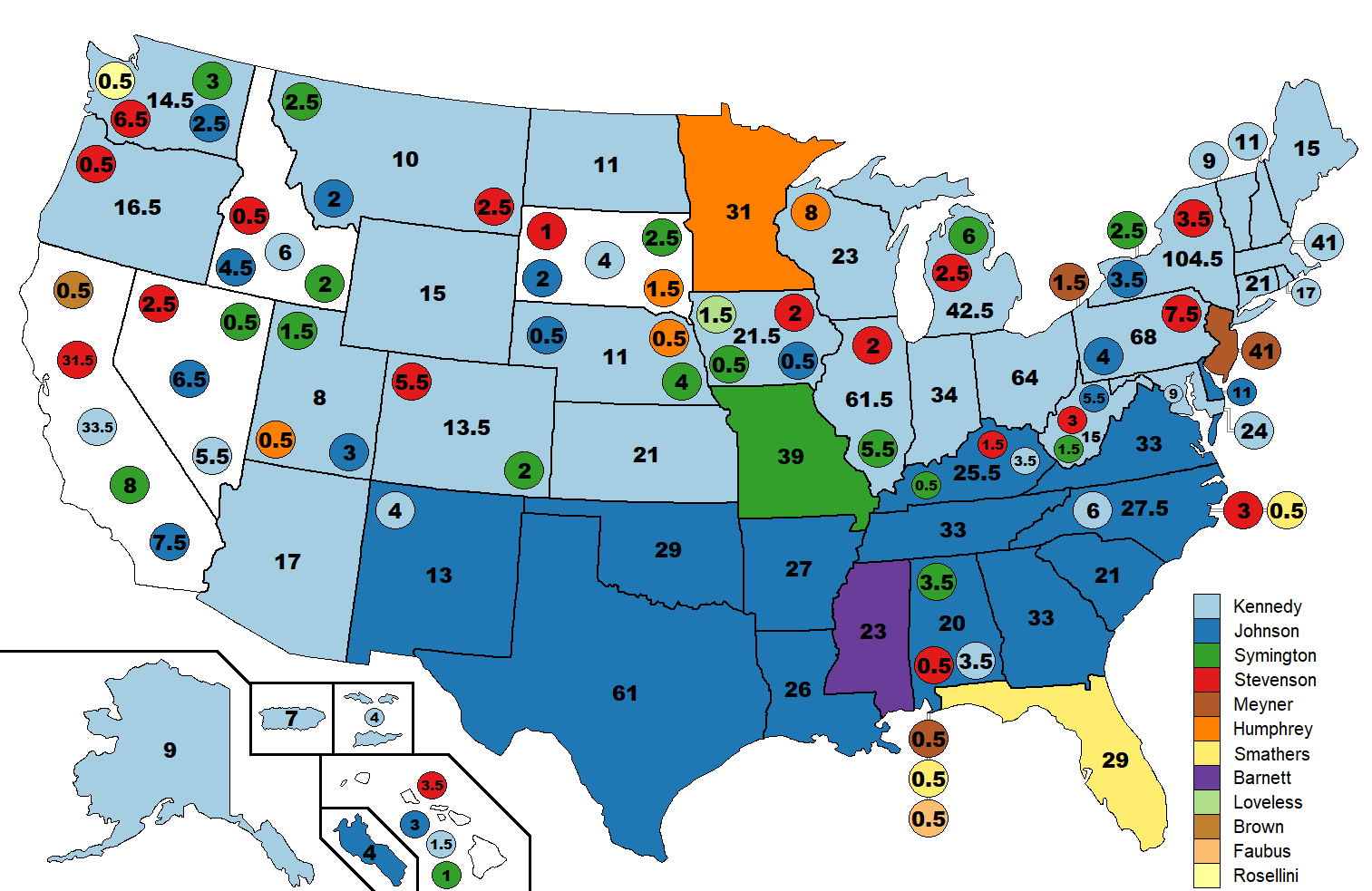
1st Presidential Ballot

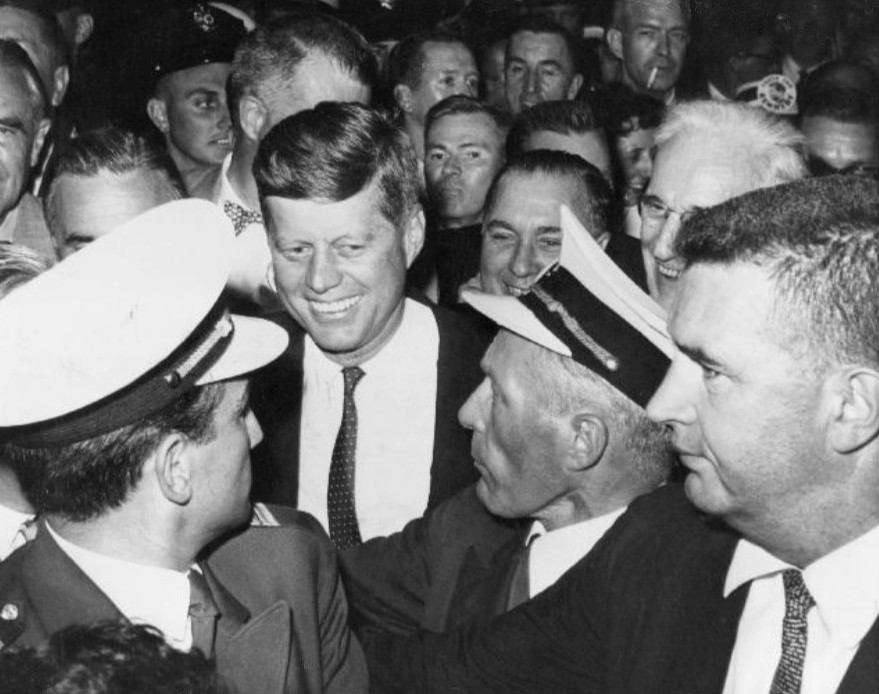
Kennedy arrives at the convention after being named the Democratic party's presidential candidate, July 13, 1960.

Kennedy was the first senator since 1920 to be nominated for the presidency by either the Democrats or the Republicans. On the last day of the convention, Kennedy delivered his acceptance speech from the adjacent Los Angeles Memorial Coliseum. In the speech he spoke about how Americans may be hesitant about him because of his faith. In his speech he said, "I am fully aware of the fact that the Democratic party, by nominating someone of my faith, has taken on what many regard as a new and hazardous risk." He went on to break down the hesitance some may have about his Catholic faith, "And you have, at the same time, placed your confidence in me, and my ability to render a free, fair, judgment...and to reject any kind of religious pressure or obligation that might directly or indirectly interfere with my conduct of the Presidency in the national interest."

Kennedy's acceptance speech also outlined his vision of "a New Frontier" which he contrasted with Franklin D. Roosevelt's New Deal, being "a set of challenges" rather than "a set of promises". He stated the idea summed up "not what I intend to offer the American people, but what I intend to ask of them."

Theodore H. White wrote in The Making of the President 1960 that in Washington, Richard Nixon watched Kennedy deliver his speech with two members of his own campaign. Nixon concluded that Kennedy's performance was poor and that he could defeat him in proposed televised debates.

== Vice presidential nomination ==
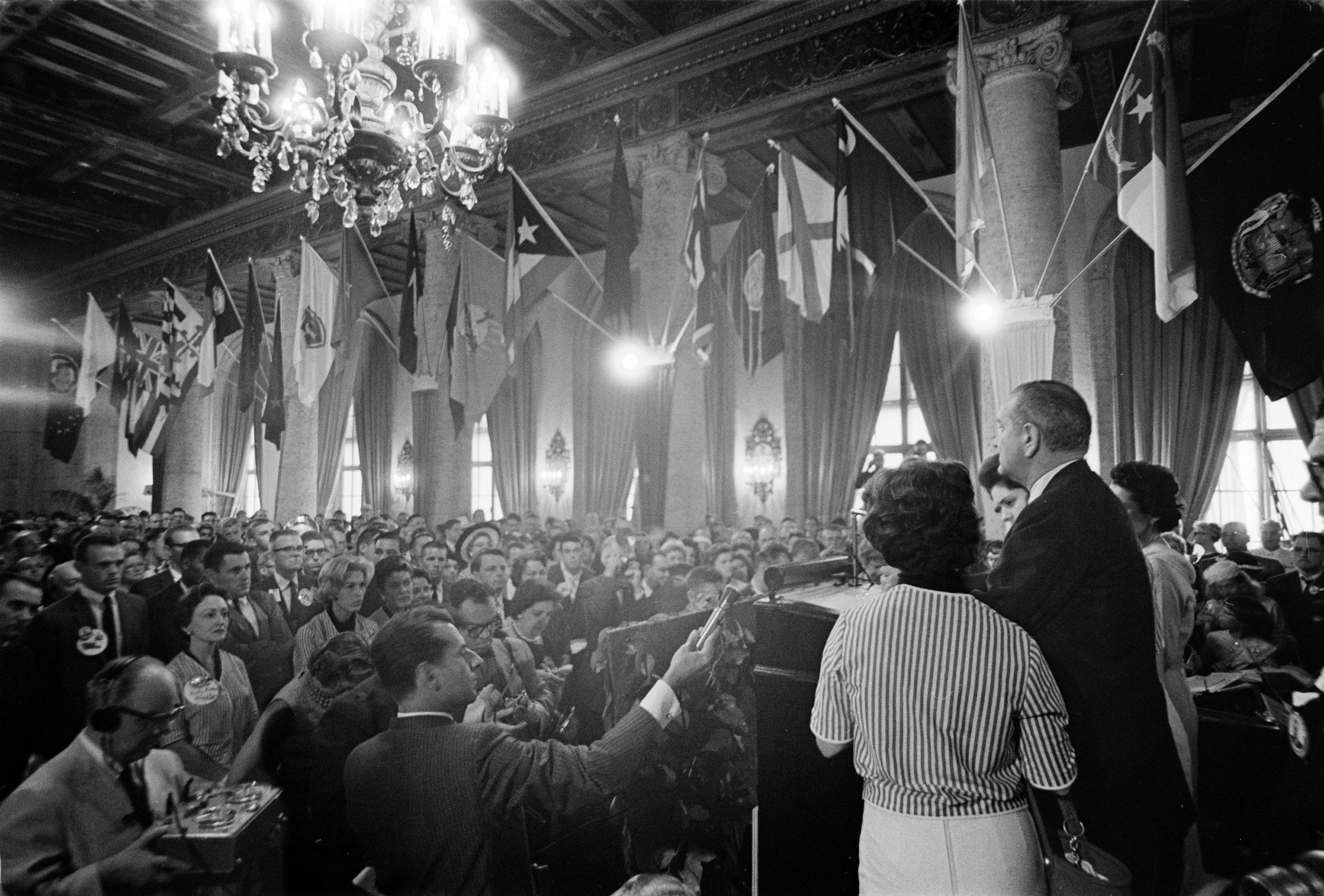
Johnson speaks to a crowd at the Biltmore Hotel

After Kennedy secured the Democratic nomination, he asked Johnson to be his running mate, a move that surprised many, and for several decades, there was much debate about why it was offered to Johnson and why he had accepted. Some speculated that it was a courtesy move for Johnson, who was the Senate Majority Leader, and that Kennedy was surprised when Johnson accepted; Kennedy had preferred Stuart Symington of Missouri or Henry "Scoop" Jackson of Washington as his running mate.

A related story is that after Johnson accepted the offer, Robert Kennedy went to Johnson's hotel suite to dissuade Johnson from becoming the vice-presidential nominee. Johnson was offended that "JFK's kid brother" would brashly urge him to stay off the ticket. In response to his blunt confrontation with Robert Kennedy, Johnson called JFK to confirm that the vice-presidential nomination was his, which JFK confirmed. Johnson and Robert Kennedy became so embittered and the episode marked the beginning of the personal and political feud that would have grave implications for the Democratic Party in the 1960s.

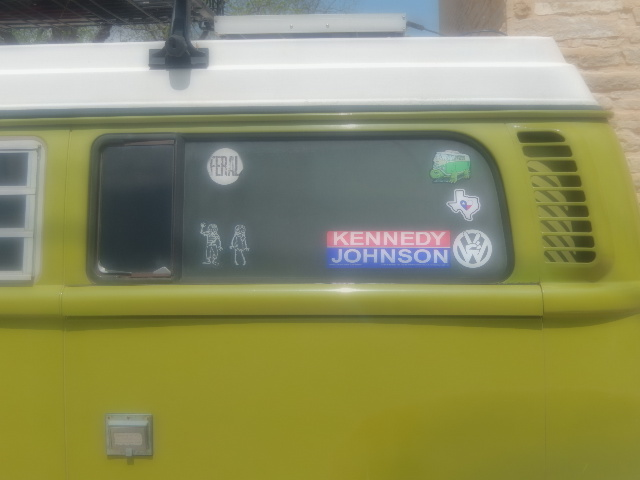
More than a half century after the formation of the Kennedy-Johnson ticket, an admirer in 2014 still displays a campaign sticker on his vehicle in Del Rio, Texas.

In 1993, Evelyn Lincoln, JFK's personal secretary (both before and during his presidency), described how the decision was made in a videotaped interview. She said she was the only witness to a private meeting between John and Robert Kennedy in a suite at the Biltmore Hotel where they made the decision. She said she went in and out of the room as they spoke and, when she was in the room, she heard them say that Johnson had tried to blackmail JFK into offering him the vice presidential nomination with evidence of his womanizing provided by FBI director J. Edgar Hoover, discuss possible ways to avoid making the offer, and conclude JFK had no choice. This portion of the videotape of Lincoln's interview was included in The History Channel's documentary series The Men Who Killed Kennedy, in concluding Episode 9, "The Guilty Men", produced and aired in 2003.

Kennedy announced Johnson as his choice of running-mate on the afternoon of July 14. Johnson was nominated by acclamation that evening. The Chicago Tribune reported that there were shouts of protest from the galleries against the motion to suspend the rules to nominate Johnson, and again when he was acclaimed. Johnson is recorded as receiving 100% of the vote.

== Logistics ==
The Biltmore Hotel served as the convention's headquarters hotel.

The keynote address was delivered by Frank Church, senator from Idaho.

== In culture ==
The convention was the setting for Norman Mailer's famous profile of Kennedy, "Superman Comes to the Supermarket", published in Esquire.

== See also ==
- 1960 Republican National Convention
- 1960 United States presidential election
- History of the Democratic Party (United States)
- List of Democratic National Conventions
- United States presidential nominating convention
- John F. Kennedy 1960 presidential campaign
- 1960 Democratic Party presidential primaries

Preceded by 1956; Chicago, Illinois	Democratic National Conventions	Succeeded by 1964; Atlantic City, New Jersey
