= 1956 Democratic Party vice presidential candidate selection =

1956 Democratic vice presidential nomination
- August 16, 1956

All 1,366 delegate votes of the Democratic National Convention 686 1/2 delegate votes needed to win
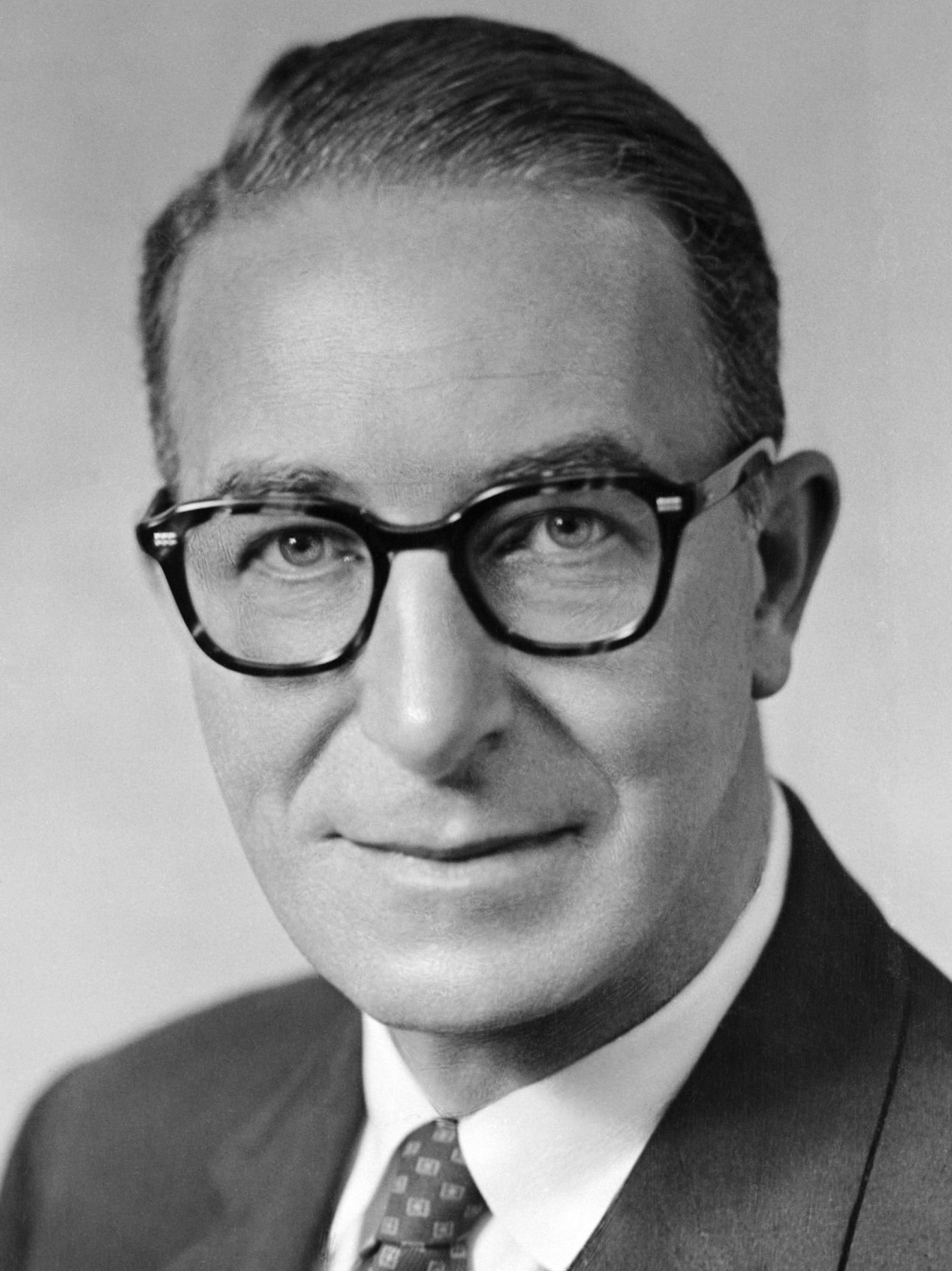

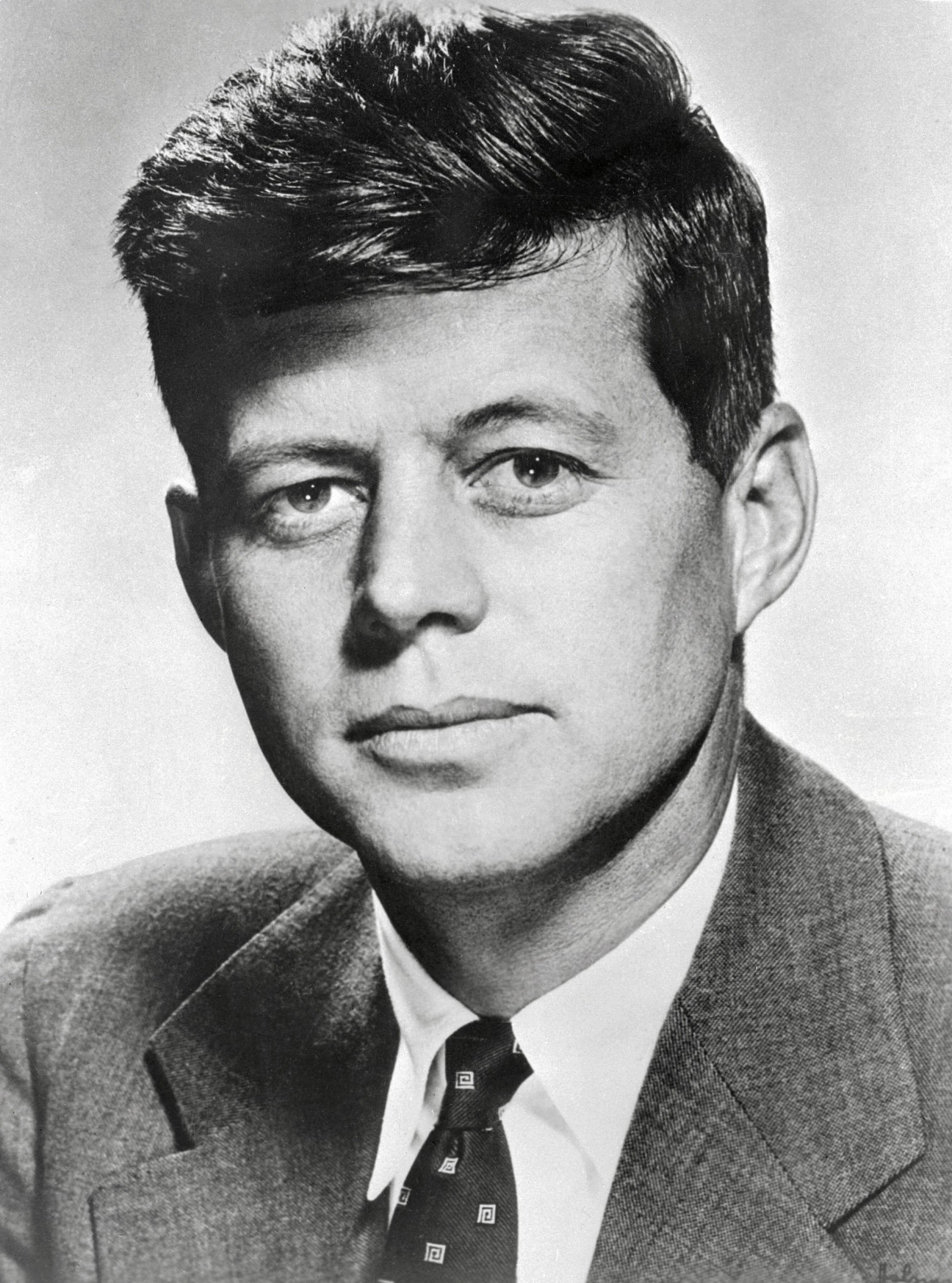

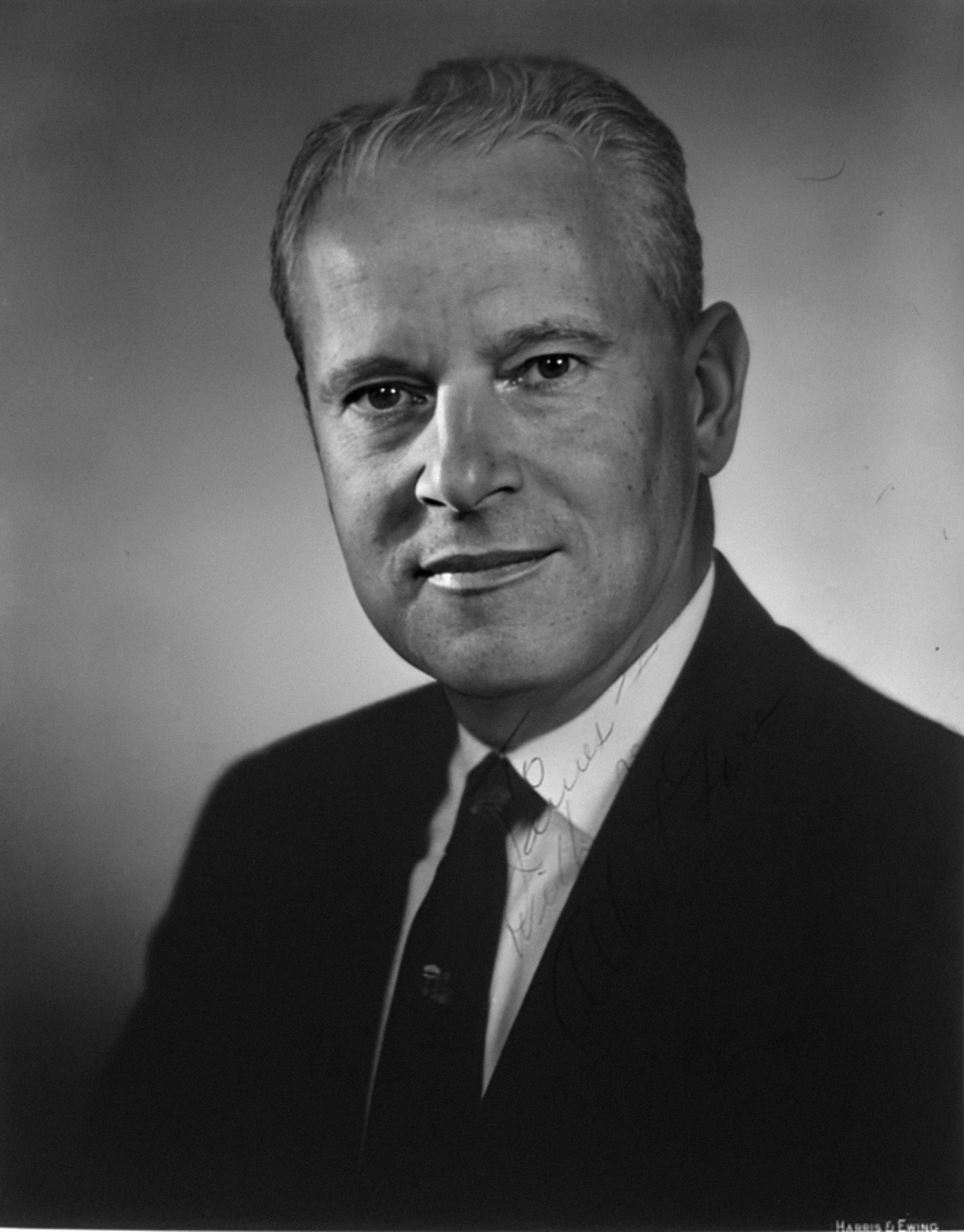

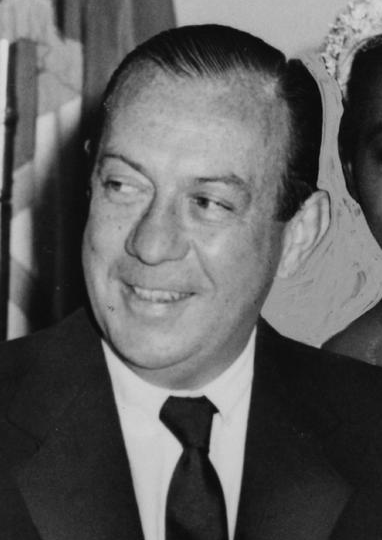

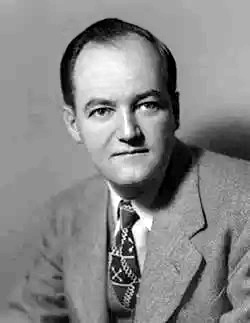
Nominee	Estes Kefauver	John F. Kennedy	Albert Gore Sr.
Home state	Tennessee	Massachusetts	Tennessee
1st Ballot (Final)	483.5 (35.24%)	304 (22.16%)	178 (12.97%)
2nd Ballot (During)	551.5 (40.20%)	648 (47.23%)	80.5 (5.87%)
2nd Ballot (Final)	755.5 (55.07%)	589 (42.93%)	13.5 (0.98%)
Nominee	Robert F. Wagner Jr.	Hubert Humphrey
Home state	New York	Minnesota
1st Ballot (Final)	162.5 (11.84%)	134.5 (9.80%)
2nd Ballot (During)	9.5 (0.69%)	74.5 (5.43%)
2nd Ballot (Final)	6 (0.44%)	2 (0.15%)
Previous Vice Presidential nominee
John Sparkman
Vice Presidential nominee
Estes Kefauver

The selection of the Democratic Party's vice presidential candidate for the 1956 United States presidential election occurred at the party's national convention on August 16, 1956. Former presidential candidate and Tennessee's Senator Estes Kefauver defeated Massachusetts' Senator John F. Kennedy.

== Background ==
Senator John Sparkman, who was the party's vice presidential nominee in 1952, was mentioned as a possible presidential candidate and later became the head of Alabama's delegation to the national convention, but did not attempt the presidential or vice presidential nomination.

On July 9, Governor Frank G. Clement, who was speculated as a possible vice presidential candidate, was selected to give the keynote address at the national convention, but he stated that he had no intention of seeking the vice presidency.

Former Massachusetts Governor Paul A. Dever stated that although Kennedy was not an active candidate he was in the running for the vice presidential nomination and that the Massachusetts, Missouri, Ohio, Michigan, and New Jersey delegations would support him. Senator Spessard Holland stated that a Stevenson-Kennedy ticket would easily carry Florida, and other Kennedy supporters stated that having a Catholic vice presidential nominee would guarantee 132 electoral votes along with those from the Solid South.

California Attorney General Pat Brown came out in support of an open vice presidential ballot and that Senators Hubert Humphrey, John F. Kennedy, Al Gore Sr., and Governor Clement were excellent choices.

== Balloting ==
After winning the presidential nomination, Adlai Stevenson II announced that he would allow the convention delegates to choose his running mate and did not support any candidate. Governor W. Averell Harriman, who had received the second highest amount of delegates on the presidential ballot, also announced that he was not interested in the vice presidential nomination.

On August 16, 1956, the vice presidential ballot started with multiple Southern favorite sons being supported on the first ballot. The Southern delegations planned to deny Estes Kefauver a majority on the first ballot, due to his anti-segregation views, and then to unify behind an acceptable candidate. Kefauver's home state, Tennessee, supported Senator Al Gore Sr. on the first ballot and then realigned its support to Kennedy on the second and third ballots.

After initially leading on the first ballot Kefauver fell behind Kennedy on the second before receiving a majority on the third ballot after Gore withdrew and endorsed him, resulting in Kefauver in first place and Kennedy in second. Governor Orval Faubus, who had opposed Kefauver's nomination, stated that his nomination "leaves us with a lot of hard work to do before November".

== Results ==
Vice Presidential Balloting
Candidate	1st (Before Shifts)	1st (After Shifts)	2nd (Before Shifts)	2nd (During Shifts)	2nd (After Shifts)	Unanimous
Kefauver	466.5	483.5	551.5	551.5	755.5	1,372
Kennedy	294.5	304	618	648	589	
Gore	178	178	110.5	80.5	13.5	
Wagner	162.5	162.5	9.5	9.5	6	
Humphrey	134	134.5	74.5	74.5	2	
Hodges	40	40	0.5	0.5	0	
Maner	33	33	0	0	0	
Collins	28.5	1.5	0	0	0	
Anderson	16	16	0	0	0	
Clement	13.5	13.5	0.5	0.5	0.5	
Brown	1	1	0.5	0.5	0	
Symington	1	1	0	0	0	
Johnson	0.5	0.5	0	0	0	
Not Voting	3	3	6.5	6.5	5.5	
