= Walton (surname) =

Origin
- Origin: Anglo-Saxon
- Meaning: habitational name for a place called Walton
- Region of origin: Oxfordshire

Walton is a toponymic surname or placename of Anglo-Saxon origins. It derives from a place with the suffix tun ('town, farm, hamlet') and one of the prefixes wald ('a wood'), walesc ('foreigner') or walh ('farm worker'). First recorded as a surname in Oxfordshire in the person of Odo de Wolton on the Hundred Rolls in 1273. People with the name include:

== A ==
- Adam Walton (b. 1971), British radio DJ
- Alan Walton (1936–2015), British-born businessman
- Albert D. Walton (1886–1951), American Attorney
- Alfred Walton (1816–1883), British radical politician
- Alice Walton (b. 1949), American heiress, daughter of Walmart founder Sam Walton
- Alice Walton (1865–1954), American classicist and archaeologist
- Alvin Walton (b. 1964), American football player
- Amy Catherine Walton (1849–1939), British author
- Amy and Emily Walton (b. 2000), twins appearing on the British soap Coronation Street
- Ann Walton Kroenke, American Walmart heiress, wife of Stan Kroenke
- Anthony Walton (politician) (born 1962), former New Zealand political party president
- Anthony Walton (poet) (born 1960), American poet and writer
- Asmaa Walton, American artist and art educator

== B ==
- Bernard Walton (1917–1972), a British classical clarinetist
- Bill Walton (1952–2024), American basketball player and sportscaster
- Billy Walton (1871–1963), English footballer
- Branden Walton (born 1998), American para-cyclist
- Brandon Walton (born 1998), American football player
- Brian Walton (bishop) (1600–1661), English cleric and scholar
- Brian Walton (cyclist) (b. 1965), Canadian track cyclist
- Bruce Walton (1951–2019), American football player
- Bruce Walton (b. 1962), American baseball player
- Bruce Alan Walton (b. 1960), alias "Branton", American author
- Bud Walton (James Lawrence Walton, 1921–1995), American retailer, co-founder of Walmart
- Bryce Walton (1918–1988), American pulp fiction writer

== C ==
- Cecile Walton (1891–1956), Scottish artist
- Cedar Walton (1934–2013), American pianist
- Chadwick Walton, Jamaican cricketer
- Charles Walton, (1921–2011), American Inventor
- Chelsea Walton (b. 1983), African-American mathematician
- Chris Walton (1933–2006), English cricketer
- Christian Walton (b. 1995), English footballer
- Christy Walton, American Walmart heiress
- Clare Walton, British senior Royal Air Force officer
- Clarence C. Walton, American academic administrator, The Catholic University of America
- Constance Walton (1919–2017), American composer
- Craig Walton (b. 1975), Australian Olympic athlete

== D ==
- Danny Walton (1947–2017), American baseball player
- David Walton (disambiguation)
- Dean Walton, a fictional character in Degrassi: The Next Generation
- Donovan Walton (b. 1994), American baseball player
- Dorothy Walton (1909–1981), Canadian badminton player
- Douglas Walton (disambiguation)
- Dwight Walton (b. 1965), Canadian basketball player

== E ==
- Edward Arthur Walton (1860–1922), Scottish artist
- Elijah Walton (1832–1880), English artist
- Ernest Walton (1903–1995), Irish physicist and Nobel Prize winner
- Evangeline Walton (1907–1996), American author
- Emma Walton (1962–present), British children's book author

== F ==
- Francis Walton (1832 – 1871), English cricket player and soldier
- Fred Walton (1865–1936), English stage actor
- Frederick Walton (1834–1928) Industrialist and inventor of Linoleum
- Frederick Walton (engineer) (1840–1925) British railway engineer

== G ==
- Genevieve M. Walton (1857–1932), American librarian
- Geoffrey Walton (1934–2020), British archdeacon
- George Walton (Royal Navy), British admiral
- George Walton (1749/50–1804), American politician
- George Walton (Manitoba politician) (died 1925), Canadian politician
- George Walton (footballer) (born 1911, date of death unknown), English footballer
- Gordon Walton (b. 1956), American computer game developer
- Col. Granville Walton, The Scout Association Scouting notable, awardee of the Bronze Wolf in 1955

== H ==
- Harold Walton (cricketer) (1874–1960), New Zealand cricketer
- Helen Walton (1919–2007), American heiress, widow of Walmart founder Sam Walton
- Henry Walton (disambiguation)

== I ==
- India Walton (b. 1982), former mayoral candidate in Buffalo, New York
- Izaak Walton (1593–1683), English writer

== J ==
- Javon Walton, American child actor
- Jerome Walton (b. 1965), American baseball player
- Jess Walton (b. 1949), American actress
- Jim Walton (b. 1948), American banker and Walmart heir
- Jim Walton (journalist) (b. 1958), American journalist, president of CNN Worldwide
- Jo Walton (b. 1964), British-born fantasy and science fiction writer
- Joe Walton (1935–2021), American football coach
- John Walton (disambiguation):
  - John Walton (1738-1783), American politician, Georgia delegate to the Continental Congress
  - John C. Walton (1881–1949), American politician, Governor of Oklahoma
  - John H. Walton (b. 1952), American Old Testament scholar
  - John T. Walton (1946–2005), American businessman and Walmart heir
  - John Walton (actor), Australian actor
  - John Ike Walton, American musician and member of 1960s rock group 13th Floor Elevators
- Johnathan Walton (b. 1974), Jamaican-born television reporter
- Joseph Walton (disambiguation)

== K ==
- Kendall Walton, American philosopher and academic
- Kent Walton (1917–2003), British television sports commentator
- Kevin Walton (1918–2009), Antarctic explorer
- Krista S. Walton, American chemical engineer

== L ==
- Lee Walton American artist
- Lisa Walton (b. 1975), New Zealand field hockey player
- Luke Walton (b. 1980), American basketball player

== M ==
- Mark Walton (American football) (b. 1997), American football player
- Mary Walton (1827–1894), American inventor
- Mike Walton (b. 1945), Canadian hockey player

== N ==
- Nancy Walton Laurie, American Walmart heiress
- Nancy Bird-Walton (1915–2009), Australian aviator

== O ==
- Mrs O. F. Walton (Amy Catherine Walton, 1849–1939), British author

== P ==
- Percy Levar Walton, American convicted murderer
- Peter Walton (rugby union), Scottish rugby player and coach
- Peter Walton (referee), English football referee
- Philip Walton (b. 1962), Irish golfer

== R ==
- Rachel Mellon Walton (1899–2006), American philanthropist
- Reggie Walton (b. 1949), American District Judge
- Rhett Walton, Australian actor
- Richard J. Walton, American politician and academic
- Rob Walton (ice hockey) (1949–2018), Canadian ice hockey player
- S. Robson Walton (b. 1945), American lawyer and Walmart heir
- Roy Walton (1932–2020), British card magician

== S ==
- Sam Walton (1918–1992), American retailer, founder of Walmart
- Sam Walton (American football) (1943–2002), American football player
- Sarah Stokes Walton (1844–1899), American poet and artist
- Simon Walton (born 1987), English football player
- Sophie Walton (born 1989), English women's footballer
- Wayne Walton (1943–2020), American Master Carpenter
- Susana Walton (1926–2010), widow of William Walton

== T ==
- Tasma Walton (b. 1974), Australian actress
- Thomas Otto Walton, president of Texas A&M University 1925–1943
- Timothy Walton (disambiguation)
- Todd Walton, (b. 1949), American writer
- Tony Walton (1934–2022), English set and costume designer and director
- Travis Walton (b. 1953), American alien abductee

== W ==
- William Walton (disambiguation), several people
- William Walton (merchant) (1706–1768), American merchant and politician in New York
- William Walton (1902–1983), British composer
- William Walton (1909/1910-1994) American painter and former chairman, U.S. Commission on Fine Arts

== Z ==
- Zamari Walton (born 1999), American football player

== Other ==
- Walton family, connected to Walmart
- The Waltons, American television series
- The Walton sextuplets, the world's first all-female surviving sextuplets, born in 1983

== See also ==
- Wolton (surname)
- Walton (given name)
