= William Walton (disambiguation) =

William Walton (1902–1983) was a British composer and conductor

William Walton may also refer to:

== In sports ==
- William Walton (cricketer, born 1862) (1862–1925), English cricketer
- William Walton (cricketer, born 1799) (1799–1882), English cricketer
- William Walton (footballer) (1871–1929), English footballer
- William Walton (rugby) (1874–1940), rugby union and rugby league footballer who played in the 1890s and 1900s
- Bill Walton (1952–2024), American basketball player and sportscaster
- Billy Walton (1871–1963), English footballer
- Bill Walton (footballer) (1894–1953), Australian rules footballer who played with Collingwood in the Victorian Football League (VFL)
- Billy Walton (hurler) (1961–2012), Irish hurler
- Bill Walton (volleyball), American volleyball coach

== In politics ==
- William Walton (bishop) (1716–1780), Vicar Apostolic of the Northern District of England
- William B. Walton (1871–1939), U.S. Representative from New Mexico
- William M. Walton (1832–1915), Attorney General of Texas
- William Walton (merchant) (1706–1768), American merchant and politician in New York
- William de Walton, MP for Lancashire

== Other ==
- William Walton (painter) (1909/10–1994), American painter and chairman, U.S. Commission on Fine Arts
- William Walton (writer) (1784–1857), English author on Spain and Portugal
- William Walton (merchant) (1706–1768), American merchant and politician in New York
- William Lovelace Walton (1788–1865), British Army officer
- William Walton (1843–1915), writer and translator
- William R. Walton (1923–2001), geologist and researcher in the study of modern foraminifera
