= Ralph Walton =

Ralph Walton may refer to:

- Ralph G. Walton
- Ralph Walton (MP), MP for Bedfordshire (UK Parliament constituency)

== See also ==
- Walton (surname)
