= Jesse Fish =

American slaver (1724/1726–1790)

- Born: 1724 or 1726
- Died: 1790
- Occupations: shipmaster, merchant, and realtor

Jesse Fish (1724 or 1726–1790) was a shipmaster, merchant, and realtor who lived in St. Augustine, Florida under both Spanish and British rule, and is infamous in the town's history to this day. He was a schemer involved in contraband trade and illegal real estate deals, and operated as a slaver, smuggler, and usurer. By his slaver activities Fish introduced most of the bozales, or African-born slaves, registered in Spanish Florida during the decade (1752–1763) preceding Spain's cession of Florida to Great Britain. He has been accused of spying for England and Spain as a double agent during the Seven Years’ War, but there is no evidence to support the claim.

== Early years ==
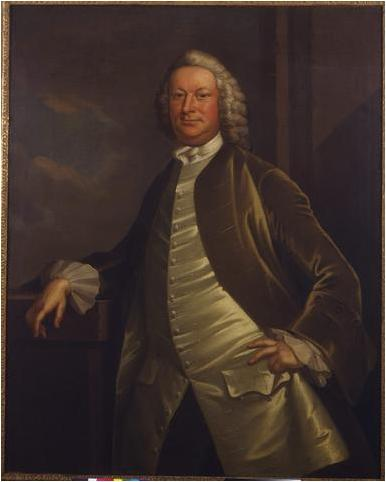
William Walton, Sr., of New York

Little is known about Jesse Fish's life, although records of some of his business associations and dealings exist. He was born in Newtown on Long Island in New York, where his ancestors had acquired substantial property in the 1600s. His father, Capt. Thomas Fish, married Elizabeth Kip, daughter of Jesse Kip of Newtown, in 1717. Jesse was born in 1724 or 1726, and arrived in St. Augustine in 1736 at the age of ten or twelve, sent there by William Walton, Sr., New York's most successful merchant, probably aboard a Walton Company sloop captained by his uncle Abraham Kip. Kip made at least twenty passages between New York and St. Augustine from 1732 to 1739.

In 1738, the year before the War of Jenkins' Ear began, the Spanish Bishop of Tricale, Francisco Menéndez Márquez, observed that all Englishmen had been banished from St. Augustine except for a teen-aged Jesse Fish, whose presence was deemed necessary for the procurement of flour and meat from New York. A petition made in 1747 for the return of Spanish prisoners from British incarceration lists Jesse Fish as master of the Walton's flag of truce vessel, the sloop Mary Magdalene.

A major shift in colonial economic policy occurred when the Royal Havana Company was permitted to contract for goods with merchants in Charles Towne and New York, who could then ship directly to St. Augustine. After 1740, English goods from the colonies were plentiful in the provincial capital; Fish continued to function as merchant and broker to supply the city from the 1740s through the 1760s. Records from the Presbyterian Church in Newtown, New York show that three out of four of the transport captains were connected with the Fish family, thus linking the Long Island mariners with St. Augustine. The Lawrence family of sea captains provided a vital trade connection between British New York and Spanish St. Augustine, while Jesse Fish, as Walton Company agent in Florida until 1763, was the liaison between the Lawrence family, the Walton ships, and St. Augustine. The Lawrence captains and the Walton merchants were first cousins, once removed.

Fish lived most of his life in St. Augustine except for occasional trips to South Carolina, Havana, and New York City. He is not known to have traveled to Europe, although he mentioned his desire to make a passage to England and Spain in his letters. As a boy he learned the Spanish language and customs in the household of the Herreras, a prominent St. Augustine family. The Herreras raised Jesse with their own son, Luciano, and the two remained lifelong friends. Luciano was one of only eight Spaniards to stay behind in St. Augustine during the British occupation, and it was he, rather than Jesse Fish, who spied on the British administration for Spain. In later years Herrera helped compile a register of Fish's properties.

== Mid-career ==
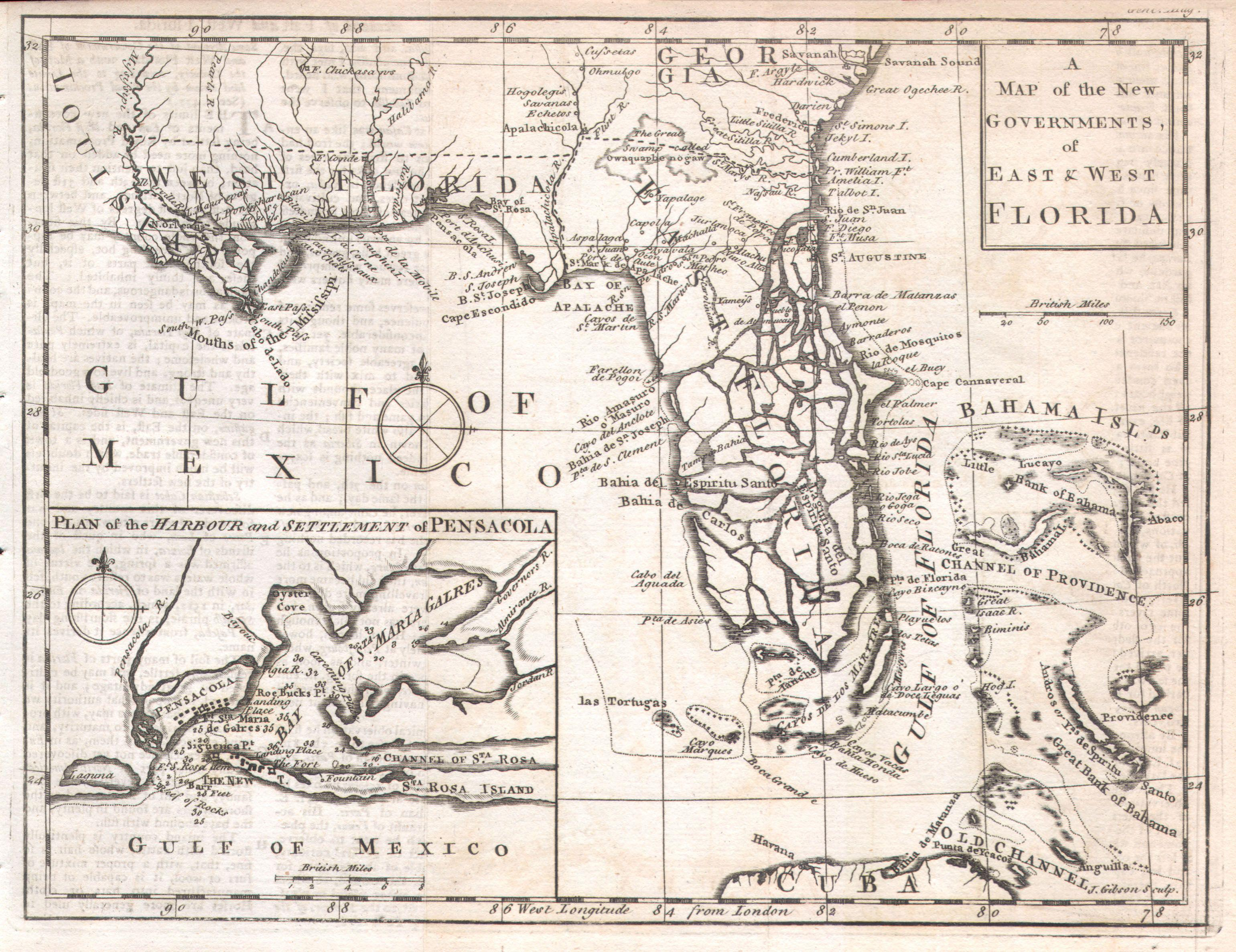
1763 Gibson Map of East and West Florida. Gentleman's Magazine. 1763

When he reached adulthood, Fish worked for the Walton Company as a factor. The New York partnership won a contract to furnish Spanish Florida provisions and supplies when the Royal Havana Company of Cuba was unable to meet the province's demand for trade goods. Illegal trade with the English supplemented St. Augustine's scant agricultural production and the unreliable situado, or royal subsidy. By 1726, the Waltons were shipping staple items into the port, and Fish eventually became their agent. He and his employers prospered, and although loyal to his Protestant faith, Fish was a respected businessman in the Catholic town of St. Augustine.

When Florida was ceded to the British in 1763, almost the entire Spanish population of St. Augustine emigrated to Cuba and elsewhere in New Spain, being promised restitution, new grants of land and employment opportunities. Many Floridanos believed that the Protestant English would not permit free practice of their Catholic faith, giving them a further incentive to leave. More than 3700 people embarked from the presidio of St. Augustine and its outposts between April 1763 and February 1764.

The Floridanos were allowed by the terms of the Treaty of Paris to sell their property to English subjects within a period of eighteen months, but few buyers were found, leaving Spanish agents unable to dispose of St. Augustine properties. After the last of the emigrants had left, Juan José Eligio de la Puente, formerly chief official of the royal accountancy (Oficial mayor de la Royal Contaduría), returned to St. Augustine from Havana with an appointment to dispose of the remaining Spanish property. Because the incoming British soldiers had little money, and civilian settlers hoped to receive outright grants of land from the British Crown, few of them were interested in acquiring Spanish real estate. Under these conditions and with the uncertainty of future sales, Puente was eventually compelled to transfer all the unsold Spanish property to an agent who would represent its owners. In July 1764, most of the houses, lots, and lands, amounting to almost 200 estates in and around St. Augustine, were conveyed from Puente to Fish.

This agreement with the Spaniards was fraught with peril for Fish; it was an illicit transaction, and as a British subject he could be charged with treason if it was discovered. Fish previously had been involved in another illegal enterprise: in the autumn of 1762, when St. Augustine was bereft of supplies, Fish, Puente, and John Gordon, the well-to-do Scottish Catholic merchant from Charles Town, had smuggled provisions in from South Carolina to prevent the settlement from starving. This was an act of treason for British subjects in a time of war between England and Spain. Even so, by 1765 Fish controlled most of the property in the city, holding more than one third of the lots and more than one-half of the private houses.

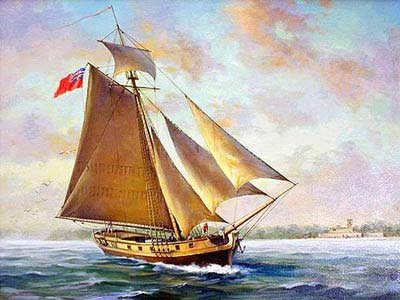
This English supply ship, the sloop Industry, owned by the Walton Company of New York, ran aground on the St. Augustine bar in 1764.

Fish bought some of the properties for his own investment portfolio, paying low prices for the city plots he intended to sell later. Substantial property in St. Augustine was purchased in the names of Jesse's uncle, Jacob Kip, William Walton, and Enoc Barton, who had lived with Fish and his son as a youth. Most of the remaining houses and lots were purchased individually by English settlers needing homes for their families. Fish also acquired more than forty two acres of land outside the presidio, about one-fourth of the occupied area, while a few English speculators secured the rest of the available property surrounding the town for future sale. A total of 185 structures and lots were appraised at over 6,000 pesos; he obtained control of several church properties as well. In the confidential arrangement with Puente, Fish agreed to dispose of the unsold properties when immigration increased and after real estate prices recovered, even beyond the time constraints imposed by the Treaty of 1763. The proceeds, minus his realty expenses, were to be paid through Juan Puente. Fish's critics accuse him of failing to transmit some of the receipts and of charging exorbitant fees, taking advantage of the Floridanos for his own profit. Fish insisted that he acted honestly and that he in fact suffered great financial losses for his efforts.

Fish acquired the largest accumulation of realty holdings in colonial St. Augustine—only the Crown of Spain controlled more property in the Floridas than he. Between 1763 and 1780 he transferred the titles of 138 estates, some of which were traded several times. His realty business prospered during 1763–1770 when he sold ninety-five separate pieces of property. Then in 1774–1778 when British Loyalists were moving south to Florida, and the Minorcans of New Smyrna fled Dr. Andrew Turnbull’s colony, St. Augustine was full of refugees in need of housing. The shortage of housing increased property values, and Fish’s real estate office again thrived, but he apparently did not maintain proper accounts, and later regretted not having necessary records. His old friend, Luciano de Herrera, compiled a long report describing many of his real estate transactions which was issued only in the last years of his life.

This register, called "Accounts of Jesse Fish", and now part of the East Florida Papers, contains entries of debits and credits, realty sales records, and lists of local proprietorships. It is likely Luciano de Herrera collaborated with Fish to prepare such a comprehensive document. In some of the transactions recorded, Fish's service fees exceeded the closing prices of the property. Loans, repairs, and various other charges were also counted as debts owed Fish by the Floridanos, whom he represented for exorbitant rates. The "Accounts" indicates he disposed of all the unsold property at a profit, yet despite his multitude of financial dealings, no records have been found of payments made to any of the former Spanish inhabitants.

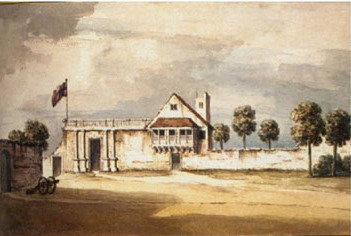
Governors house, St. Augustine, Florida. November 1764

It is possible Fish paid the Spaniards on one of his several trips to Cuba; in 1766 Governor Grant gave him permission to sail on the pilot boat Dependence to Havana to settle some of his accounts, but the results of that trip are not known. A petition made by Fish to the Crown of Spain in 1789 alleged that he had paid some of the former property owners, but he also admitted outstanding debts of "many thousands of pesos". Subsequent testamentary proceedings in the St. Augustine judiciary supported his contention of having made some payments. Many of his creditors had died in Cuba during the epidemics of yellow fever which struck the island, but more of them survived to confront Fish later. Some of the Floridanos, their heirs, or representatives eventually returned to Florida to reclaim their properties or seek the compensation owed them. The secret compact with Puente had been made in order to prevent the properties from being forfeited to the crown at the expiration of the period allowed; however, the sale was not recognized as valid by the Spanish authorities upon their return in 1783. The 185 lots thus reverted to the King of Spain, and were sold at auction on terms very favorable to the purchasers.

Fish was frustrated in some of his other land speculations: his claims to additional lands in partnership with John Gordon were disallowed by British officials. Gordon was a merchant and slave trader from Charles Town who formed a partnership with Fish, the St. Augustinian operating as his agent. The two partners purchased largely from the outgoing Spaniards, but the British authorities refused to allow the deeds to be recorded. These officials disregarded entirely the conveyances of the church property, and proceeded to take possession of it in defiance of the provisions of the Treaty of 1763. Because the Spanish monarchy had proprietorship rights in the patronato real relationship of church and state, those same prerogatives were claimed in the name of the English monarch, who had assumed sovereignty in Florida. All tierras realengas (royal lands) in St. Augustine, including the church estates, thus reverted to the British Crown. The Catholic Church and the two speculators were subsequently required to turn over the buildings and all the land in their transaction to the British government. On orders from England, the Spanish bishop's house was seized for use of the Church of England, and the Convent of St. Francis, which had the best well in the town, was taken to house British troops, extensive barracks being erected on the old foundations.

Early attempts to colonize British East Florida were hindered, particularly in St. Augustine, the capital of the province, by speculators like Jesse Fish and John Gordon who held such great tracts of land in their possession. Fish and Gordon claimed ownership of a huge section of 4,600,000 acres on both banks of the St. Johns River, as far south as Ponce de Leon Inlet and westward as far as Alachua, and including a considerable portion of the Tampa Bay area. The Commissioners for Trade and Plantations rejected the validity of Fish and Gordon's "pretended purchase", telling their agents it was inconsistent with the spirit of the Treaty of 1763. Governor James Grant refused to confirm their grants and distributed the property to actual settlers. Years later, after many applications, broadsides initiated through the popular press in America and in England, the intervention of influential friends in London, and a voyage to England, John Gordon obtained some compensation.

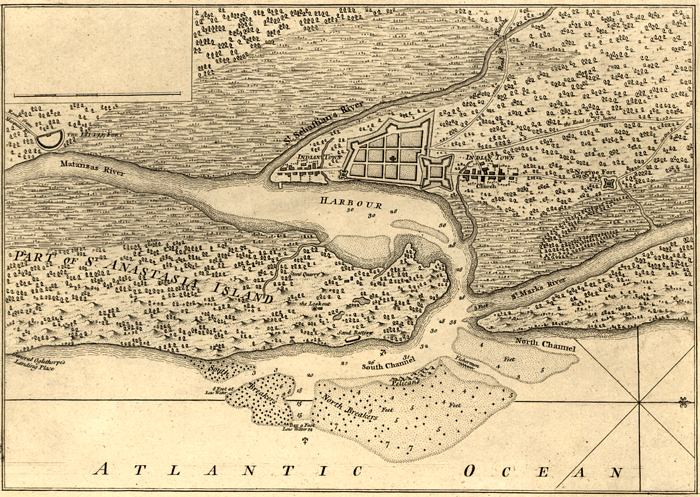
Plan of the Town and Harbour of St. Augustine, 1762

According to contemporary accounts, Fish purported to be the sole proprietor of Santa Anastasia Island, located across Matanzas Bay from St. Augustine. The island comprised 10,000 acres stretching along fourteen miles of the coast from the city south to Matanzas Inlet. Fish built the great house of his plantation, El Vergel (the Orchard), on the island in 1763, where its orchards and orange groves produced abundantly for decades. Tens of thousands of barrels of sweet oranges and hundreds of barrels of orange juice were eventually exported from the plantation, and before the end of the British Period, Jesse Fish was renowned for the quality of his citrus fruit. In the 1770s his oranges were popular in London, and were in high demand there for the making of shrub, a mixed drink with alcoholic spirits, sugar and juice.

In a letter dated August 10, 1830 and published in the Southern Agriculturist, George J. F. Clarke, a planter whose family had owned a plantation on the Matanzas River since 1770, described the careful picking and handling of the oranges grown by Jesse Fish and shipped safely to London, where they had found favor for their sweetness.

André Michaux, appointed royal botanist to King Louis XVI in 1785, was sent to North America the same year on a mission to make the first organized investigation of American trees and plants that could be of use to French building and carpentry, medicine and pasture forage. On March 12, 1788, he began a botanizing trip on the east coast of Florida at El Vergel, having heard of its elaborate gardens with lemon and sweet orange trees, and of Fish's experiments with growing olives and dates. Michaux called the place a paradise, and went so far as to call Jesse Fish the most hard-working and industrious man in all of Florida.

Fish depended on the labor of African slaves to work his plantation, owning seventeen of them in 1786-1787; by the beginning of the Second Spanish Period in Florida, Santa Anastasia Island had become a hacienda used for cattle ranching as well as the cultivation of sweet oranges, and hundreds of wild horses ran free there.

== Later years ==
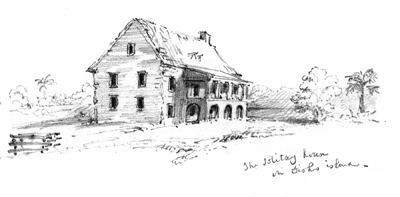
Jesse Fish's El Vergel plantation house

By 1784, Fish had lost most of his land holdings and had accumulated large debts in St. Augustine and Cuba. He still held Santa Anastasia Island, forty houses and lots, and six other tracts of uncultivated land near St. Augustine. His buildings were described by observers as being in advanced stages of decay; El Vergel was in a similar condition according to a Spanish appraisal. Acknowledging that the auction of Fish's possessions would not satisfy even half his indebtedness to the expatriates, Governor Zéspedes proposed that all the vacant property in St. Augustine, including Fish's share, should be confiscated by the Crown for distribution to returning Floridanos. He also recommended that the King impose time limits for the repossession of unoccupied property to avoid confusion when the former proprietors or their heirs asserted their claims. Zéspedes wanted to register all legitimate proprietorships purchased from such realtors as Fish during the British Period; by this means he hoped to forestall disruption of the traditional real estate system in St. Augustine. Following the Spanish exodus of 1763, twenty years of British rule, and the retrocession of Florida to Spain in 1784, Zéspedes faced many problems concerning the disposition of property; his manner of addressing them was expeditious and suitable to the complex situation in St. Augustine.

Fish finally paid some of the Spaniards for the sale of their Florida property, although during the last few months of his life, he claimed to be nearly destitute. To settle his obligations of over 9,000 pesos to the former proprietors, Fish offered the government all his property except El Vergel. Apparently the offer was accepted—his heirs received El Vergel as their only inheritance. The site of the plantation was known thereafter as "Fish Island." Despite all of his real estate activities, El Vergel's citrus production, and various land holdings, he complained of penury and indebtedness, which he portrayed to the Waltons as insurmountable. In the spring of 1789 Fish wrote the King of Spain telling of his financial situation and requesting permission to make a voyage to Europe. His planned itinerary included a business trip to London and an audience with Charles IV to plead his case in Madrid. Fish was willing to place all his property in trust of a royal agent while overseas, but he probably never went since he died only eleven months after submitting his request. In his petition he alluded to his "meager" holdings in St. Augustine, although he admitted that the plantation on Santa Anastasia Island yielded enough produce to sustain his retirement there. For the rest of his life, Fish lived as a recluse at El Vergel to escape financial and marital problems. He stated his reasons for choosing self-imposed exile from St. Augustine bluntly: "Oppressed by my debts to the Waltons and afflicted by separation and domestic infelicity, I retired to my present habitation."

After retiring, Fish avoided his wife and her family. He had married Sarah Warner, his second wife, in 1768 when he was in his forties. She was a native of Newtown, New York also, and daughter of James Warner, the newly appointed harbor pilot of St. Augustine. Two children, Jesse, Jr., and Fabiana Furman Fish, were born to the couple before they separated. Sarah inherited El Vergel after the deaths of her husband in 1790 and of their son in 1812, although her claim to the estate was later challenged by both the Spanish and the American governments.

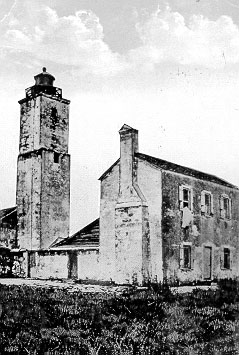
Original Anastasia Island lighthouse, now destroyed. Lower parts of the coquina tower dated to the First Spanish Period.

What exactly happened to Fish's previous wealth and vast land holdings is unknown. Fish had entered into some unprofitable business relationships with his relatives, especially his brother-in-law Jacobus Kip, whom he entrusted to represent his affairs in St. Augustine. His 1789 petition to the Spanish government stated that upon his retirement to El Vergel he had transferred most of the unsold real estate in trust to Kip, who was supposed to sell the property received from Puente and use the commissions to pay Fish's debts to the Walton Company. Fish had probably borrowed from the firm to finance his land purchases, but only later realized how disastrous his partnership with Kip was. Fish was ruined, and died almost penniless.

Jesse Fish died on February 8, 1790, within a year of making his petition to the King. He was buried in a crypt near his house on Santa Anastasia Island, since a Protestant could not be interred in the Catholic cemetery of St. Augustine. Thus ended the career of Jesse Fish, the legendary 18th-century entrepreneur and land speculator of British and Spanish East Florida. Grave robbers later desecrated his tomb looking for the gold rumored to be buried there, though none was ever found.

In 1791, Governor Juan Nepomuceno de Quesada contested Jesse Fish's will, alleging that it disposed of property actually belonging to the Spanish Crown. It is a matter of record that the 10,000 acre grant of land originally made by the crown to Fish, and subsequently purchased at auction in 1795 by his son, Jesse Fish, Jr., amounted to the whole of "St. Anastasia" island, except certain lands marked off by officials as reserved, such as the King's Quarry. His wife and heir, Sarah, lived until 1824 and eventually became sole owner of the entire estate, but by this time her inheritance included little property outside Santa Anastasia Island. Her claim was reported to Congress in 1826 as valid by the commissioners for East Florida and the Secretary of State of the US, and subsequently confirmed by an act of Congress on May 23, 1828.
