= Georgi Bolshakov =

GRU operative (1922–1989)

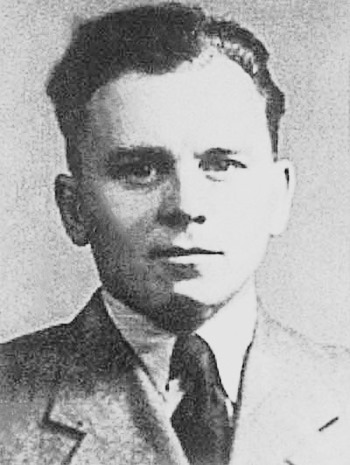

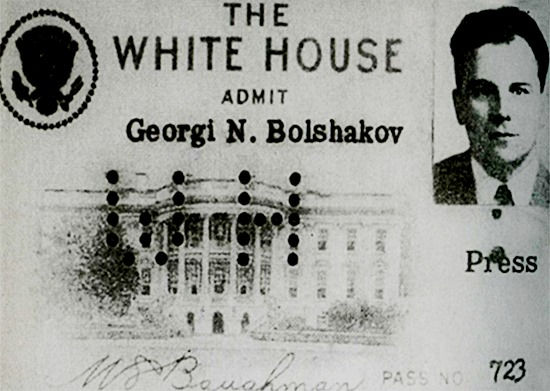
Press pass at White House

Georgi Nikitovich Bolshakov (Russian: Георгий Никитович Большаков; 1922–1989) was a Soviet GRU officer under journalist cover who was posted to Washington, D.C., twice, most significantly in the early 1960s. In this capacity, he played a major role in diplomacy between the United States and the Soviet Union during the beginning of the John F. Kennedy administration. President Kennedy’s brother, Attorney General Robert F. Kennedy, secretly met with Bolshakov on numerous occasions in 1961 in order to gain more information about Soviet intentions and convey messages from the administration to the top Soviet leadership, including Premier Nikita Khrushchev.

Bolshakov was thus a vital back-channel contact between the American and Soviet governments. The Kennedy administration used him to set up the Vienna Summit in June 1961 and, even more importantly, to defuse and resolve the Berlin Crisis in October of that year.

According to Soviet archives and the artist William Walton, Walton was sent to the USSR by Robert Kennedy in the days after the assassination of his brother. He was to go there for the purposes of cultural diplomacy but was also told to meet with Bolshakov, and deliver a message. Walton told Bolshakov that Robert and Jackie Kennedy believed there was a conspiracy involved in the killing of President Kennedy and informed him that Robert Kennedy shared the views of his brother in his approach to peace with the USSR.

A more precise evaluation of the level and impact of Bolshakov’s role in US-Soviet diplomacy awaits further release of archival records.

== Notes and references ==
=== Sources ===
- Fursenko, Aleksandr; Naftali, Timothy (1998). One Hell of a Gamble: Khrushchev, Castro, and Kennedy, 1958-1964 (1st ed.). New York: W. W. Norton & Company, Incorporated. ISBN 978-0-393-24551-6.
- Kempe, Frederick (2011). Berlin 1961: Kennedy, Khrushchev, and the most dangerous place on earth. New York: Penguin Group.

=== External links ===
- К.Таривердиев.Карибский кризис (in Russian)
- И.Хлебников.КАРИБСКИЙ КРИЗИС:ПЕРЕЛОМ (in Russian)
- А.Фурсенко.ГЕОРГИЙ БОЛЬШАКОВ - СВЯЗНОЙ ХРУЩЕВА С ПРЕЗИДЕНТОМ КЕННЕДИ (in Russian)
