= Rose bengal =

Tetrachloro-tetraiodo-fluorescein used as stain

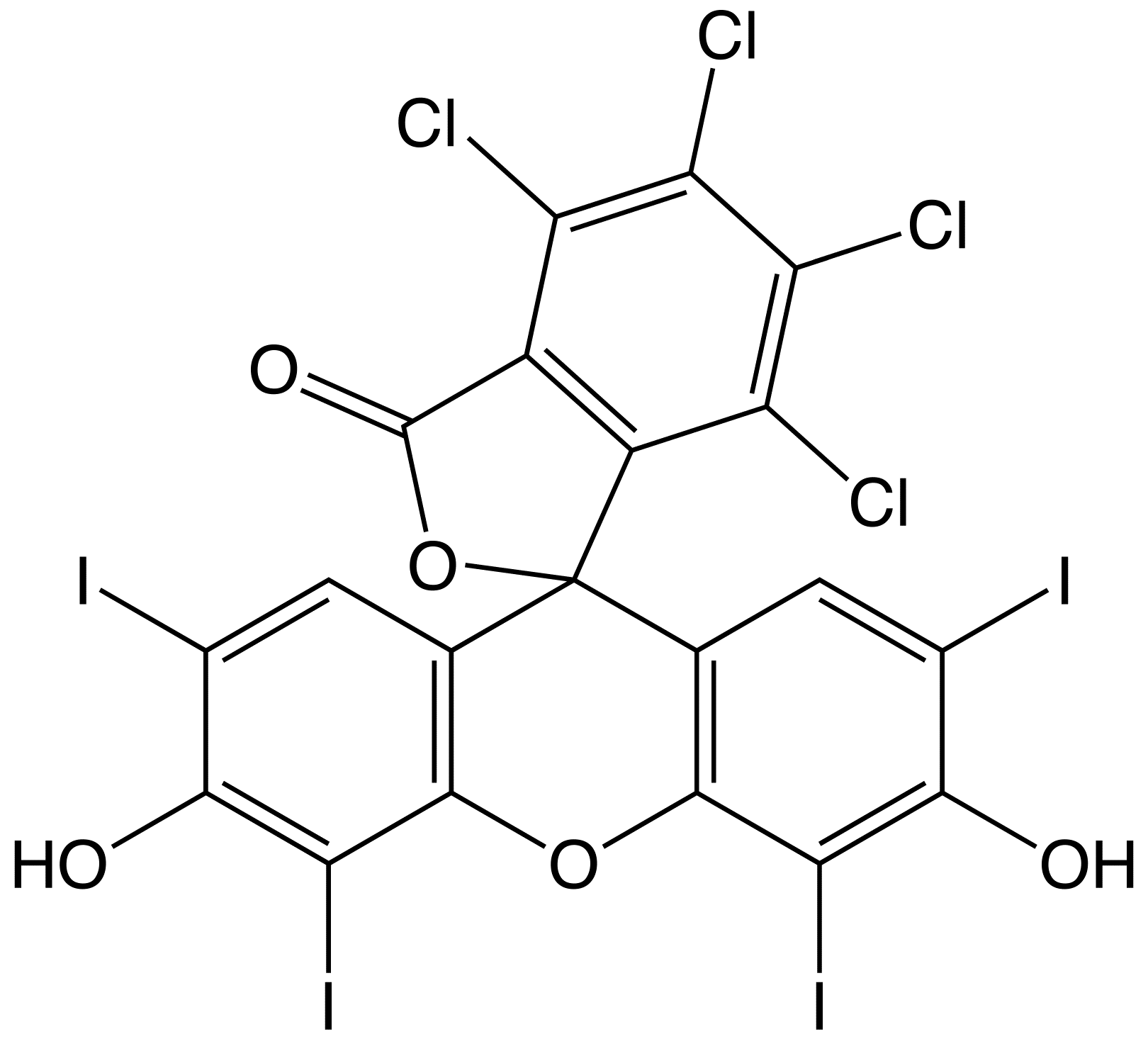

Names
- Preferred IUPAC name 4,5,6,7-Tetrachloro-3′,6′-dihydroxy-2′,4′,5′,7′-tetraiodo-3H-spiro[[2]benzofuran-1,9′-xanthen]-3-one
- Other names * C.I. 45440: C.I. Acid Red 94

Identifiers
CAS Number	4159-77-7
3D model (JSmol)	Interactive image
ChEMBL	ChEMBL1160160
ChemSpider	62647
ECHA InfoCard	100.021.813
EC Number	223-993-4
PubChem CID	69439
UNII	BIU7Q7W2SH
CompTox Dashboard (EPA)	DTXSID0048426
- InChI: InChI=1S/C20H4Cl4I4O5/c21-9-7-8(10(22)12(24)11(9)23)20(33-19(7)31)3-1-5(25)15(29)13(27)17(3)32-18-4(20)2-6(26)16(30)14(18)28/h1-2,29-30H Key: IICCLYANAQEHCI-UHFFFAOYSA-N
- SMILES: O=C(O1)C2=C(C(Cl)=C(Cl)C(Cl)=C2Cl)C31C4=C(C(I)=C(O)C(I)=C4)OC5=C(I)C(O)=C(I)C=C53

Properties
Chemical formula	C_{20}H_{4}Cl_{4}I_{4}O_{5}
Molar mass	973.67 g/mol 1,017.65 g/mol (sodium salt)

Pharmacology
ATC code	S01JA02 (WHO)

Hazards
- GHS labelling
Pictograms	(GHS07: Exclamation mark)
Signal word	Warning
Hazard statements	H315, H319, H335
Precautionary statements	P261, P264, P271, P280, P302+P352, P304+P340, P305+P351+P338, P312, P321, P332+P313, P337+P313, P362, P403+P233, P405, P501
- Except where otherwise noted, data are given for materials in their standard state (at 25 °C [77 °F], 100 kPa). verify (what is ?) Infobox references

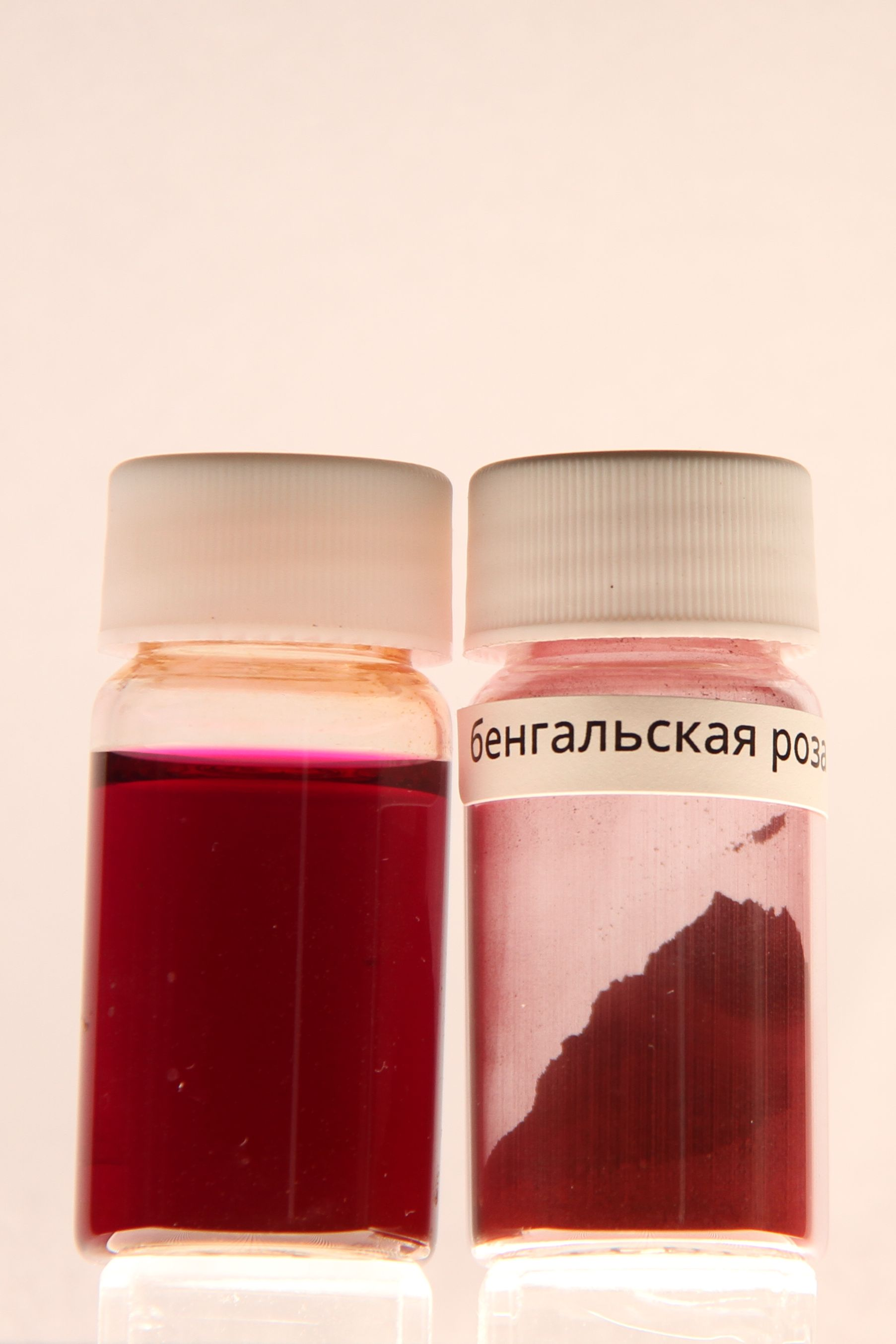
Rose bengal solid and solution in water

Rose bengal (4,5,6,7-tetrachloro-2',4',5',7'-tetraiodofluorescein) is an organic molecule often used as a stain. Rose bengal belongs to the class of organic compounds called xanthenes. Its sodium salt is commonly used in eye drops to stain damaged conjunctival and corneal cells and thereby identify damage to the eye. The stain is also used in the preparation of foraminifera for microscopic analysis, allowing the distinction between forms that were alive or dead at the time of collection.

A form of rose bengal is also being studied as a treatment for certain cancers and skin conditions. The cancer formulation of the drug, known as PV-10, is currently undergoing clinical trials for melanoma, breast cancer and neuroendocrine tumors. The company also has formulated a drug based on rose bengal for the treatment of eczema and psoriasis; this drug, PV-10, is currently in clinical trials as well.

== History and etymology ==
Rose bengal was originally prepared in 1882 by Swiss chemist Robert Ghnem, as an analogue of fluorescein. Rudolf Nietzki at the University of Basel identified the principal constituents of rose bengal as iodine derivatives of di- and tetra-chlorofluorescein. The compound was originally used as a wool dye. It has been used as a food colorant in Japan, but is discontinued. Its name derives from rose (flower) and Bengal (region); it is printed as rose bengal or Rose Bengal in the scientific literature.

== Chemical applications ==
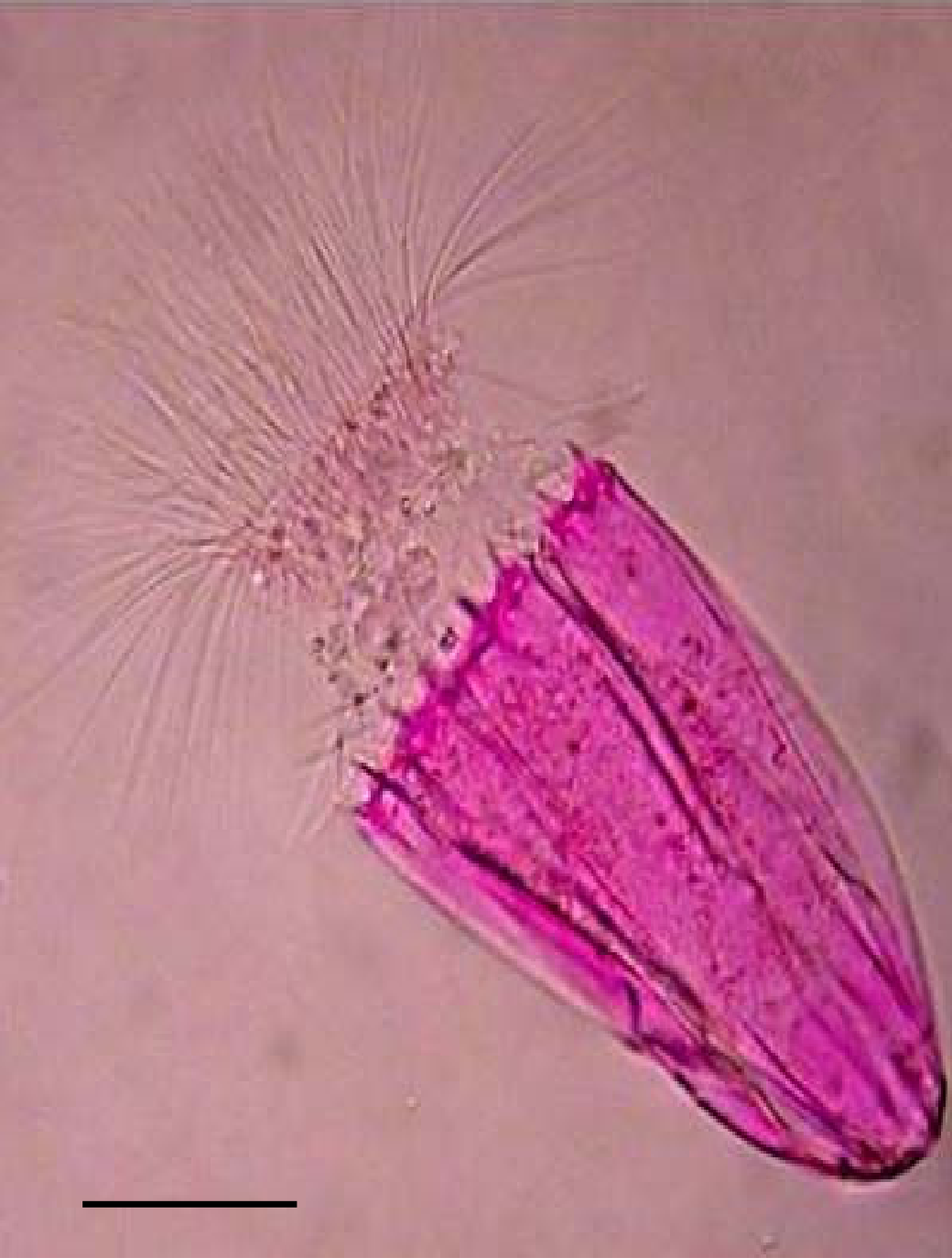
Optical microscopy image of the undescribed species of Spinoloricus from Loricifera stained with rose bengal.

Despite its complicated photochemistry involving several species, rose bengal is also used in synthetic chemistry as a visible light photoredox catalyst and to generate singlet oxygen from triplet oxygen. The singlet oxygen can then undergo a variety of useful reactions, particularly [2 + 2] cycloadditions with alkenes and similar systems.

=== Derivatives and salts ===
Rose bengal can be used to form many derivatives that have important medical functions. One such derivative was created so to be sonosensitive (sensitive to ultrasound waves), but photoinsensitive, so that with a high intensity focused ultrasound, it could be used in the treatment of cancer. The derivative was formed by amidation of rose bengal, which turned off the fluorescent and photosensitive properties of rose bengal, leading to a usable compound, named in the study as RB2.

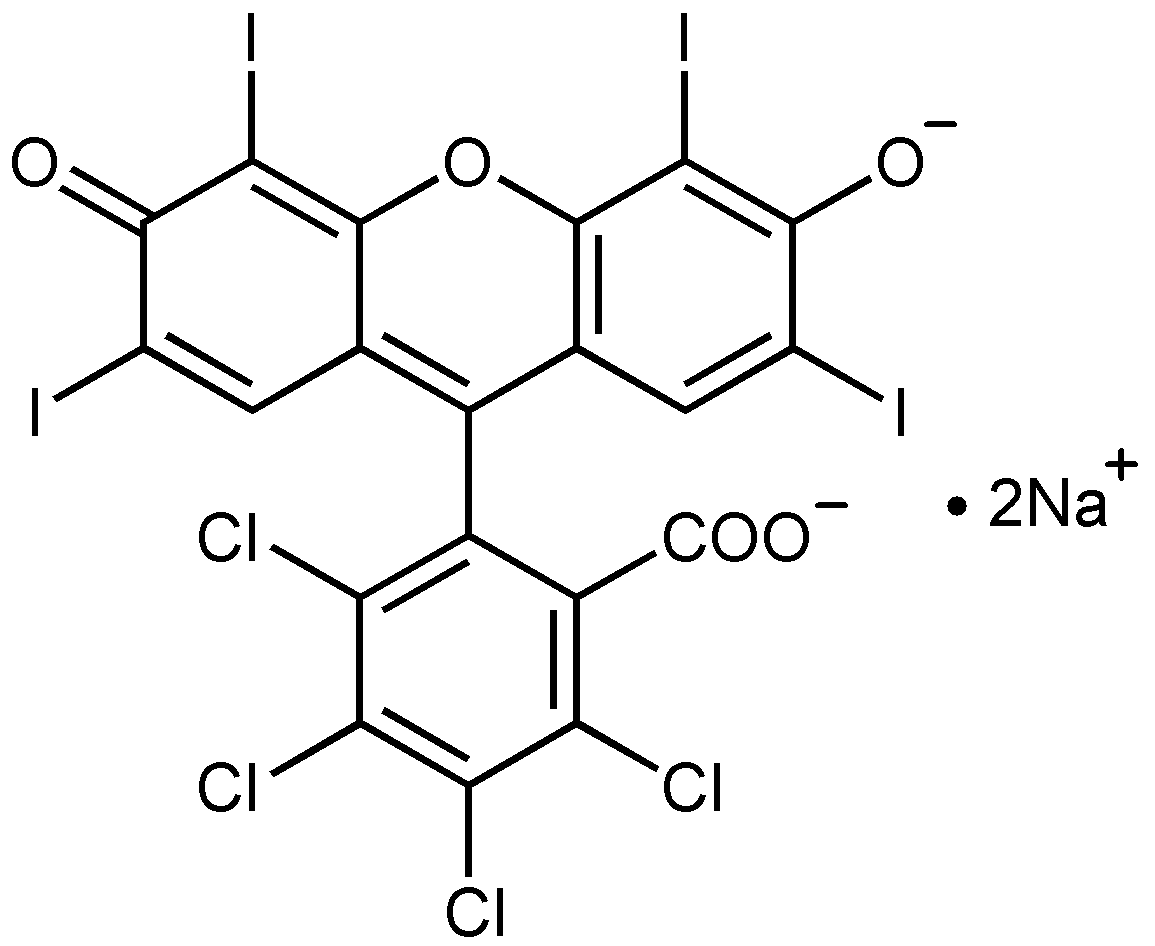
rose bengal disodium salt

Salts of rose bengal include C_{20}H_{2}Cl_{4}I_{4}Na_{2}O_{5} (CAS 632-69-9). This sodium salt is a dye, which has its own unique properties and uses.

== Biological applications ==
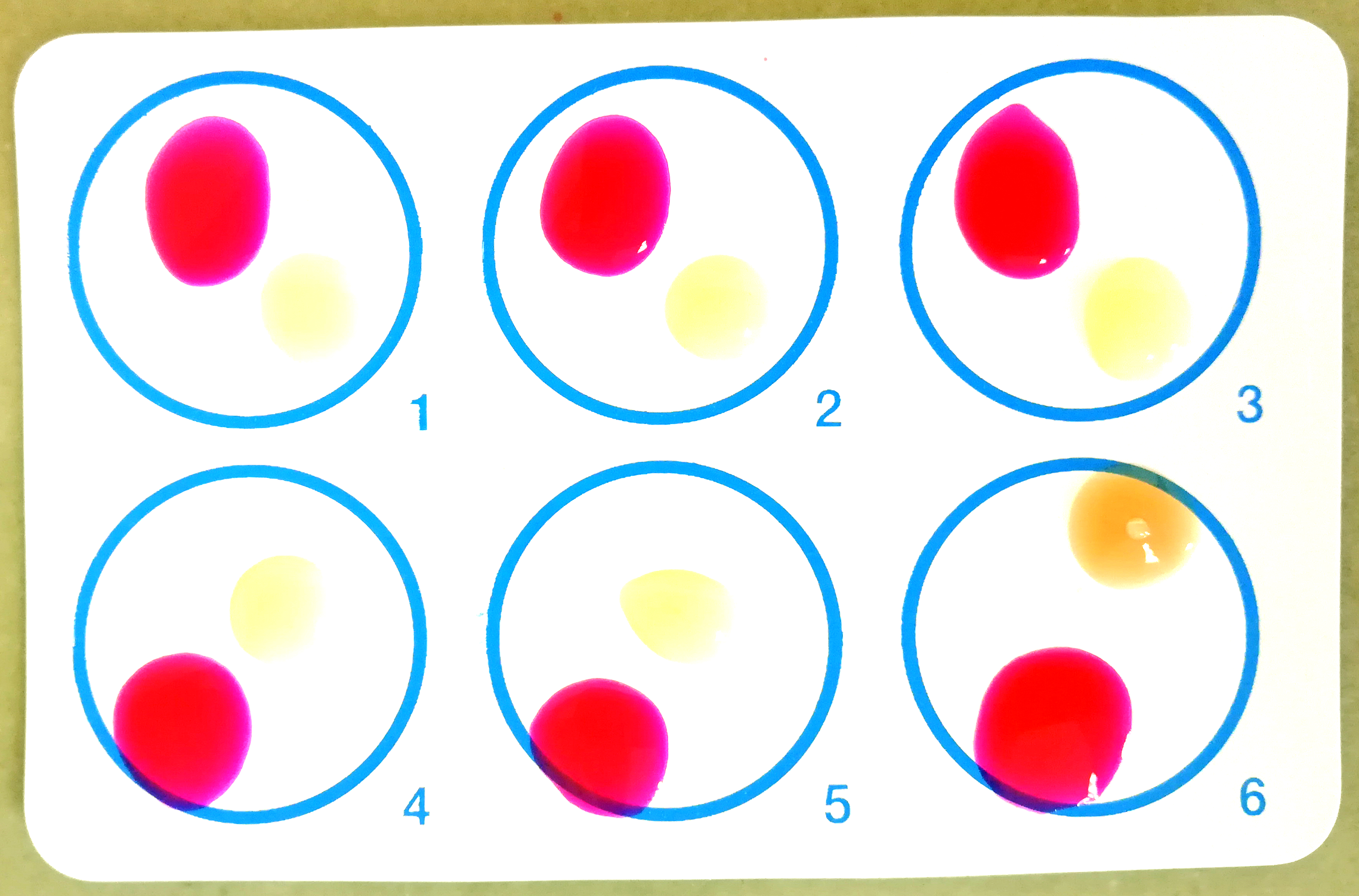
Before Brucella Rose Bengal Test application

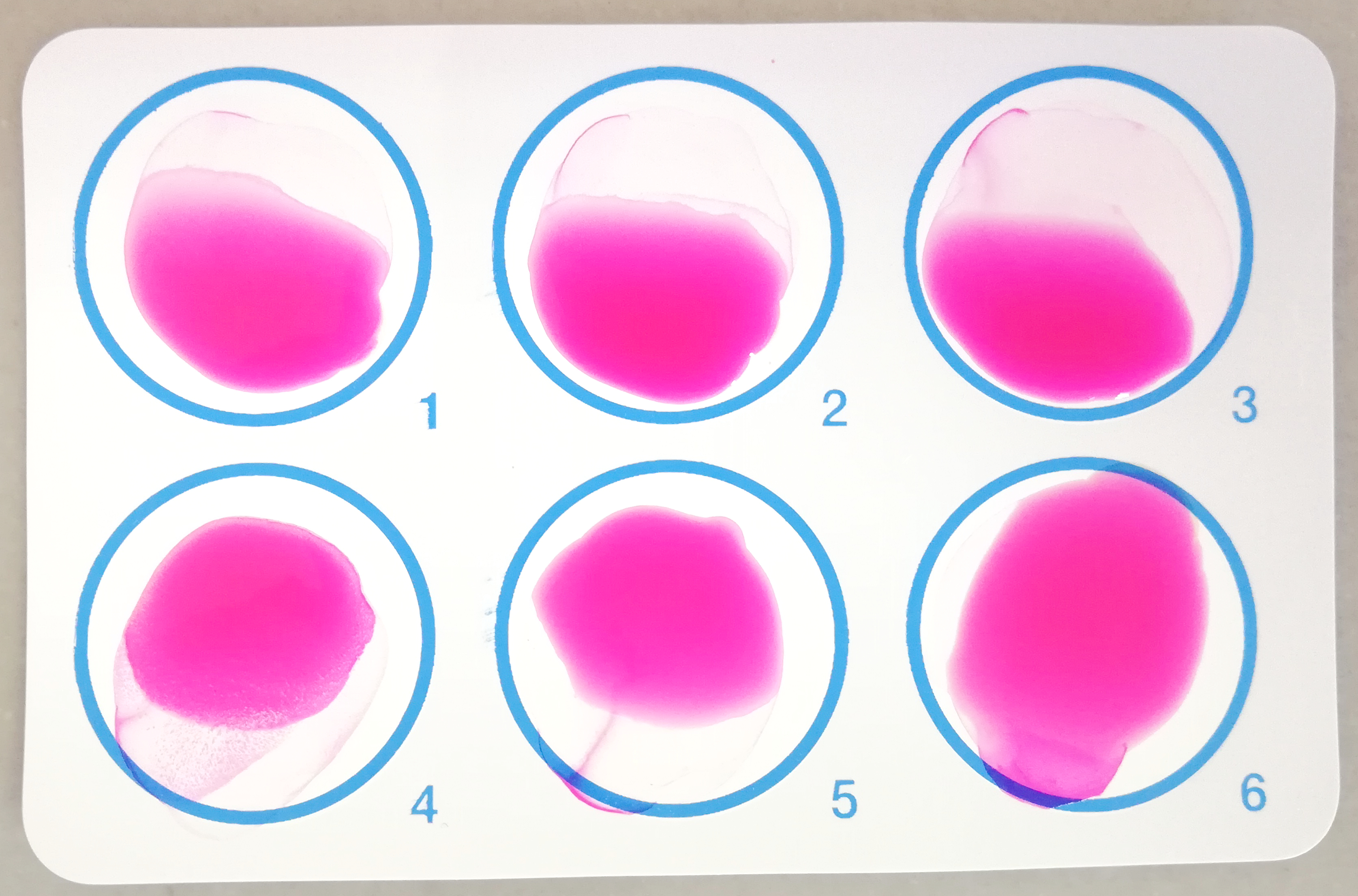
After Brucella Rose Bengal Test application

=== Cancer treatment ===
PV-10 (an injectable form of rose bengal) was found to cause an observable response in 60% of tumors treated, according to researchers in a phase II melanoma study. Locoregional disease control was observed in 75% of patients. Also confirmed was a "bystander effect", previously observed in the phase I trial, whereby untreated lesions responded to treatment as well, potentially due to immune system response. These data were based on the interim results (in 2009) of the first 40 patients treated in an 80-patient study. As of April 2016, a phase-3 study of PV-10 as a single agent therapy for patients with locally advanced cutaneous melanoma (Clinical Trials ID NCT02288897) was enrolling patients. However this trial was terminated early due to other advances in treatment of melanoma.

Rose bengal has been shown to not just prevent the growth and spread of ovarian cancer, but also to cause apoptotic cell death of the cancer cells. This has been demonstrated in vitro, in order to establish that rose bengal is still a possible option in the treatment of cancer.

Rose bengal has been used to treat colon cancer. In one such study, a protective immune response was generated from immunogenic cell death.

Rose bengal acetate can act as a photosensitiser and may have potential in photodynamic therapy to treat some cancers.

=== Stroke ===
Rose bengal is also used in animal models of ischemic stroke (photothrombotic stroke models) in biomedical research. A bolus of the compound is injected into the venous system. Then the region of interest (e.g., the cerebral cortex) is exposed and illuminated by LASER light of 561 nm. A thrombus is formed in the illuminated blood vessels, causing a stroke in the dependent brain tissue.

=== Diagnostic agent ===
Rose bengal has been used as a protoplasm stain to discriminate between living and dead micro-organisms, particularly Foraminifera, since the 1950s when Bill Walton developed the technique.

Rose bengal has been used for 50 years to diagnose liver and eye cancer. Rose bengal dye is mixed with the homogenate of Brucella and pH of the solution is maintained at 3.8, and this dye is used to diagnose Brucellosis by agglutinating the suspected serum. Rose bengal is slightly irritating and toxic to the eye. It has also been used as an insecticide.

Rose bengal stains cells whenever the surface epithelium is not being properly protected by the preocular tear film, because rose bengal cannot enter the cells due to the protective functioning of preocular tear films. Thus, rose bengal is often useful as a stain in diagnosing certain ocular medical issues, such as conjunctival and lid disorders.

Rose bengal has been used for ocular surface staining to study the efficacy of punctal plugs in the treatment of keratoconjunctivitis sicca.

=== Anti-microbial treatment ===
Eye injury and improper contact lens wearing can cause infectious keratitis. and subsequent infection. RB photodynamic antimicrobial therapy inhibits the growth of some of the causes of infectious keratitis including Fusarium fungus, Pseudomonas and Acanthamoeba. Activation by green light (500-550nm) causes RB to release ROS (reactive oxygen species) which damages the DNA of the microbes without harming healthy eye tissue.

Rose bengal is used to suppress bacterial growth in several microbiological media, including Cooke's rose bengal agar.

=== Wound treatment ===
Rose bengal is being researched as an agent in creating nano sutures. Wounds are painted on both sides with it and then illuminated with an intense light. This links the tiny collagen fibers together sealing the wound. Healing is faster and the seal reduces chances of infection.
