= Walton (given name) =

Walton is a masculine given name. For its etymology, see Walton (surname).

Walton as a given name may refer to:

- Walt Bachrach (1904–1989), American politician, mayor of Cincinnati, Ohio
- Walton Ford (born 1960), American painter
- Walton Goggins (born 1971), American actor
- Walton Hale Hamilton (1881–1958), American law professor and economist
- Walt Kirk (1924–2012), American National Basketball Association player
- Walton Musser (1909–1998), American inventor and engineer
- Walton Walker (1889–1950), United States Army four-star general
- Walton Alfonso Webson (fl. 1992–present), Antiguan diplomat
