= Floridanos =

Total population
- unknown

Languages
- Spanish

Religion
- Predominantly Roman Catholic

Related ethnic groups
- Other Hispanos; of the United States: Californios, Neomexicanos, Tejanos; Other Hispanic and Latino peoples: Chicanos, Mexican Americans, Mexicans, Spaniards, Indigenous Mexican American, Afro-Mexicans, Cubans, Spanish Americans, Louisiana Criollos, Louisiana Isleños

Floridanos (meaning "Floridians" in English) were colonial residents of the Spanish settlements in St. Augustine and Pensacola who were born in Spanish Florida. Descendants of the original Floridanos can be found throughout the state, especially in St. Augustine, as well as in Miami, Tampa, and Orlando.

== History ==
Established on September 8, 1565, St. Augustine is the oldest continuously inhabited European settlement in what is now the United States. From that time onward, there was a regular exchange of settlers, soldiers, families, and governance between Florida and Cuba, both territories of the Spanish Crown. Following Spain's defeat in the Seven Years' War, Spain ceded Florida to Great Britain in 1763. Almost all of St. Augustine's Spanish settlers left Florida during the period that British ruled East Florida, with most of them moving to Cuba. More than 3,000 Floridanos left Florida for Havana, Cuba between 1763 and early 1764. Spanish Floridians in west Florida mostly fled to Veracruz, Mexico, with about 620 sailing from Pensacola. The term "Floridano" was the term used by the colonial authorities to designate Floridians bound for Cuba. Spain recovered East Florida and gained control of West Florida through the Peace of Paris of 1783. The governors of the provinces of East and West Florida promoted European migration to them. Florida was ceded to the United States in 1819 by the Adams–Onís Treaty.

In 2010, an historical marker titled "Los Floridanos" that commemorates the Floridanos was unveiled at St. Augustine's Visitor Information Center.

== Demographics ==
The number of descendants of Spanish settlers in Florida is unknown. However, two of the earliest settlers, Francisco Sanchez and Manuel Solana, are known to have between 500 and 1,000 descendants living in the state. Manuel Solana was a descendant of Alonso Solana who had arrived to Florida in 1613 as a soldier in the Spanish military. These settlers were some of the few Spaniards who remained in Florida when the territory was ceded to Great Britain in 1763. Their descendants founded the Los Floridanos Society in St. Augustine, whose main function is to teach the history and legacy of the first settlers (1565-1763) to interested people. Some people of Cuban origin living in Florida also have ancestors in Colonial Florida. Some of the descendants of East Florida Governor José María Coppinger, who was not a settler of Florida and lived in Cuba his last years, also live in Florida.

== Notable Floridanos ==
- Eligio de la Puente (1724–1781), Floridano who held various public offices in St. Augustine, Florida and in Havana, Cuba during the 18th century

== See also ==
- Spanish Florida
  - East Florida
  - West Florida
  - List of colonial governors of Florida
- Californios
- Nuevomexicanos
- Tejanos
- Isleños
  - Isleños (Louisiana)
- Spanish Indians
- Hispanics
