= Eligio de la Puente =

Spanish auditor (1724–1781)

- Born: Juan José Eligio de la Puente y Regidor; July 1, 1724; Saint Augustine, La Florida
- Died: August 28, 1781 (aged 57); Havana, Captaincy General of Cuba
- Occupations: Chief officer of the Real Contaduría (in La Florida), auditor for the Tribunal de Cuentas (in Havana and Florida), royal treasury (in Cuba), land agent (in Florida)

Juan José Eligio de la Puente y Regidor (1724–1781) was a Spanish Floridian (Floridano) who held various public offices in St. Augustine, Florida (San Agustín de la Florida) and in Havana, Cuba, during the 18th century. He served as chief officer of the Real Contaduría for Spanish Florida, and as principal auditor for the Tribunal de Cuentas in Havana, offices that managed the colonial governments' accounts and expenditures. Puente was a member of St. Augustine's 18th century elite Criollo community, and had a role in many events of that period in the history of Florida. He acquired considerable wealth, became a royal treasury official in Cuba, and influenced Spanish foreign policy in North America.

In the autumn of 1762, when St. Augustine was bereft of supplies during the war between England and Spain, part of the global conflict of the Seven Years' War, a ship's captain called Jesse Fish, a Scottish Catholic merchant from Charles Town called John Gordon, and de la Puente had smuggled provisions in from South Carolina to prevent the settlement from starving. The years 1763 and 1764 are the best documented of his life. He held the position of Chief Officer of the Royal Accountantcy (Oficial mayor de la Real Contaduría), or chief auditor of Florida, and is best known as the land agent appointed by the Spanish Crown to sell the real estate of the Floridanos who left the province en masse at the end of the first Spanish period in La Florida. De la Puente's actions as a land agent, however, were only a small part of his distinguished career of thirty years in military and civil service of the Crown.

== Early years ==
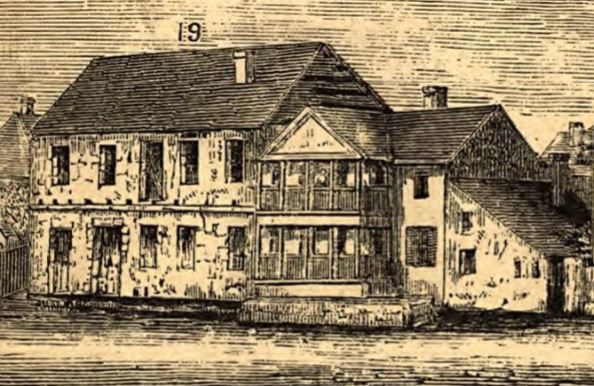
Eligio de la Puente House in St. Augustine, Florida, !855

De la Puente was born in St. Augustine on 1 July 1724, the third of eight children. His parents were Antonio Nicolás Eligio de la Puente, a native of Havana, Cuba, and Agustina Regidor, whose family had lived in St. Augustine for many years. He began his service to the Spanish crown about 1739, when he entered the Spanish army as an infantry cadet. On 5 February 1747, he married María Sánchez, with whom he had at least six children who were born in the town. The family lived between Marine and Charlotte Streets just south of the Plaza de la Constitución, according to his own map of the city. De la Puente and his family later became prominent in Cuba. His sons included a military officer, a royal accountant, and a priest.

== Agent for the Spanish Crown ==
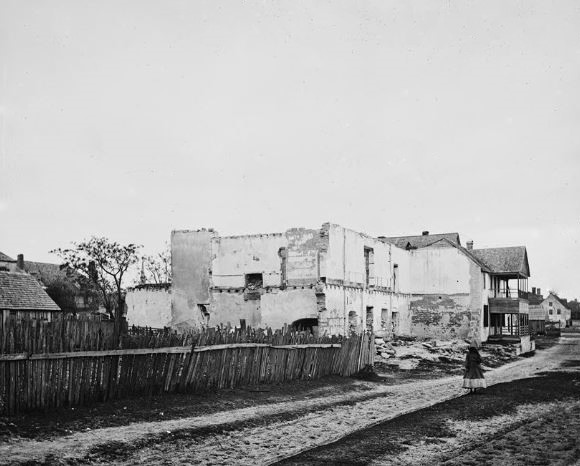
Ruins of Eligio de la Puente House, St. Augustine, photographed in 1864

The Seven Years' War formally ended nearly 200 years of Spanish occupation of Florida. The 1763 Treaty of Paris settled the long, costly conflict between Great Britain and the alliance of France and Spain, which had entered the war in 1761.

When Florida was ceded to the British in 1763, almost the entire Spanish population of St. Augustine emigrated to Cuba and elsewhere in New Spain, being promised restitution, new grants of land and employment opportunities. More than 3700 people embarked from the presidio of St. Augustine and its outposts between April 1763 and February 1764. The Floridanos were allowed by the terms of the Treaty of Paris to sell their property to English subjects within a period of eighteen months, but few buyers were found, leaving Spanish agents unable to dispose of St. Augustine properties.

After the last of the emigrants had left, de la Puente, formerly chief official of the royal accountancy (Oficial mayor de la Royal Contaduría), returned to St. Augustine from Havana with an appointment as the official sales commissioner to dispose of the remaining Spanish property.

On 22 January 1764, de la Puente finished his map of the city of St. Augustine, one of the earliest plans to depict the buildings of colonial St. Augustine. After the Treaty of Paris ceded Florida to England, he served as a land agent selling the real estate of the Spanish evacuees. As one of his official duties, he drew this plan of the city and its existing structures. It was the first map of St. Augustine that included detailed information about almost 400 properties in the city, including lot sizes, the names of property owners, lot dimensions, and materials used to construct the buildings such as wood, stone, or tabby (ripio).

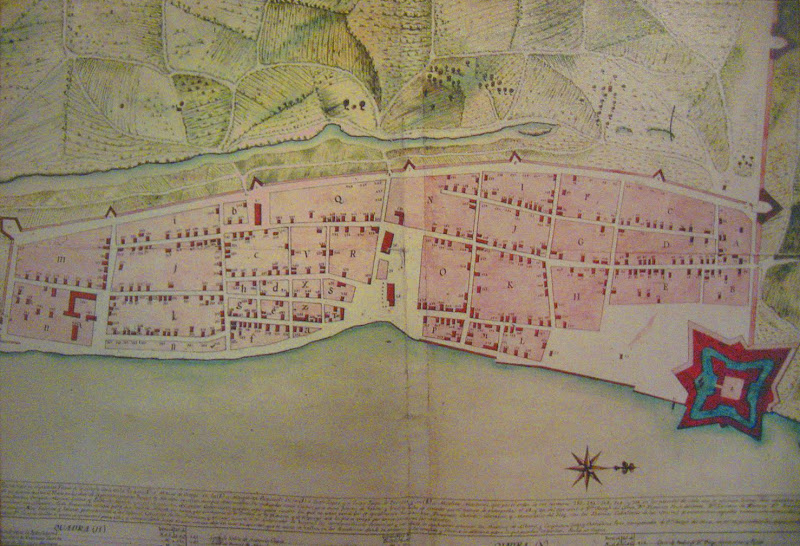
Map drawn by de la Puente, showing property lots of St. Augustine, 1764

De la Puente was appointed as royal agent representing the Catholic Church, the Spanish Crown, and the private citizens of St. Augustine. He negotiated sales of property to fetch the highest prices possible, and transferred the Friary of St. Francis, the Church of Our Lady of the Milk (Nuestra Señora de La leche), and the bishop's house to John Gordon, who was to sell the church estates and remit the profits to de la Puente as agent for the Church. Most of the remaining unsold houses, lots, and lands, amounting to almost 200 estates in and around St. Augustine, including the Tolomato Church and the walls of the unfinished parish church, were conveyed from de la Puente to Jesse Fish, a factor for the Walton Exporting Company of New York, in July, 1764.

Because the incoming British soldiers had little money, and civilian settlers hoped to receive outright grants of land from the British Crown, few of them were interested in acquiring Spanish real estate. Under these conditions and with the uncertainty of future sales, de la Puente was eventually compelled to transfer all the unsold Spanish property to an agent who would represent its owners.

== Influence with the Native peoples ==
In 1747, when he was only twenty-three years old, Eliglo de la Puente conducted negotiations by the Spanish with the Muscogee Indians (Uchise or Uchize) of Florida, and secured a lasting peace with them. De la Puente was widely known and had gained a favorable reputation among the Indians of Florida. While traveling to Havana in 1762, he and his party were set upon by Uchises at Key West, but he pacified them by simply identifying himself. He ended another confrontation near St. Augustine later that year with a similar response.

Because of this prestige he was in demand after he emigrated to Havana for the official receiving and interviewing of Indian visitors from Florida. After the outbreak of the American Revolution, Spain allowed the rebelling British colonies to outfit and repair their vessels and sell their prizes of war in Havana and in New Orleans. Juan de Miralles y Trayllon, an outfitter of ships and a trader in contraband who spoke fluent English, served as an intermediary between the rebels and the Spanish authorities. In 1777 Spain ordered the Captain General of Cuba to send agents to Jamaica, Florida, and the Thirteen Colonies; Eligio de la Puente, a brother-in-law of Miralles, was dispatched to monitor British movements and investigate the possibility of obtaining the cooperation of the Indians of Florida in case of a Spanish attack on the region.

De la Puente maintained his contacts among the Florida Indians throughout the British occupation (1763–1783) of the province. The Uchise were frequent visitors to Cuba during this period. They were usually transported across the Strait of Florida to Cuba by Cuban fishermen who fished in the Gulf Coast waters of Florida, especially at Charlotte Harbor and Tampa Bay. The Uchise wanted to maintain commercial ties with the Spanish, who sought intelligence concerning the British, and they were treated hospitably by the governor of Cuba, Felipe Fons de Viela, Marquès de la Torre, who appointed Eliglo de la Puente to receive them. When disputes arose between the various groups of the Native peoples of Florida, representatives of one or of both factions would try to get passage to Havana aboard any Cuban fishing vessel they encountered on the Gulf coast, to plead their case before Eligio, leaving it to him to determine what was the just course of action. His decision was never questioned, according to historians Mark Boyd and José Navarro Latorre.

== Later years ==
Eligio de la Puente died in Havana on 28 August 1781. His remains were interred in the Capilla de la venerable orden tercera de Servita, dressed in the habit of the Franciscan Order.
