= Joseph Walton =

Joseph, Joe or Jo Walton may refer to:

== Sportspeople ==
- Joseph Walton (footballer, born 1868) (1868–1940), English association footballer of the 1890s
- Joe Walton (1935–2021), coach in college and professional American football
- Joe Walton (footballer, born 1881) (1881–1962), English association footballer of the 1900s (Preston North End, Tottenham Hotspur, Sheffield United)
- Joe Walton (footballer, born 1882) (1882–1954), English association footballer of the 1900s (New Brompton, Chelsea, Barry, Swansea Town)
- Joe Walton (footballer, born 1925) (1925–2006), English association footballer

== Writers ==
- Jo Walton (born 1964), Canadian-Welsh novelist and poet
- Jo L. Walton (born 1982), British poet and novelist

== Others ==
- Joseph Walton (convict) (1830–?), convict transported to Western Australia
- Sir Joseph Walton, 1st Baronet (1849–1923), Liberal Party MP for Barnsley, 1897–1922
- Joseph Walton (judge), English judge
- Joseph Walton (British Army officer) (died 1808), Master Gunner, St. James's Park
- pseudonym for the American film director Joseph Losey
