= William R. Walton =

US foraminiferal micropaleontologist (1923–2001)

- Born: William Ralph Walton; April 11, 1923; Fort Worth, United States
- Died: April 23, 2001 (aged 78); Valparaiso, Indiana, United States
- Occupation: Oceanographer
- Spouse: Ann Walton
- Children: 2
- Writing career
- Pen name: Bill Walton
- Period: 1950–1990
- Subjects: Micropaleontology, foraminifera

Dr. William Ralph "Bill" Walton (1923–2001) was a leading researcher in the study of modern foraminifera.

https://upload.wikimedia.org/wikipedia/commons/thumb/2/29/WRW.jpg/120px-WRW.jpg

== Personal details ==
Bill Walton was born April 11, 1923, in Fort Worth, Texas. Walton was a pilot in the Army Air Corps during World War II. He died on April 23, 2001, in Valparaiso, Indiana.

== Education ==
After the war he returned to finish his undergraduate degree at Amherst College; he graduated with an Honors A.B. in geology in 1949. There he worked closely with Fred B. Phleger, a premier academic foraminiferologist (who transplanted his research group to SIO in 1949); this close friendship and joint interest in living foraminifera lasted throughout the lives of both men. Bill's Scripps/UCLA doctoral thesis (1954) under Phleger, was titled "The Ecology of Living Foraminifera, Todos Santos Bay, Baja California." His field work employed the RV E.W. Scripps, crewed in part by fellow graduate students.

== Rose Bengal Dye ==
In 1952, while a graduate student, Walton published the paper "Techniques for recognition of living foraminifera". This would become his most-cited paper. It describes a technique for using a protoplasm stain, Rose bengal, to discriminate between living and dead foraminifera in modern samples. Generations of scientists have used this stain on samples taken from oceans around the world and successfully determined how deep in the sediment living foraminifera were burrowing. The technique has proven controversial with some scientists claiming it tends to "overstain". Walton considered these claims to be baseless and stated that "people are not following the published technique".

== Professional career ==
Immediately upon graduation Bill Walton joined Gulf Oil Company in their Research and Development in Pittsburgh as a paleoecologist. Moving to Amoco Oil Company in 1957 he rose from paleoecologist to research director for geology and geochemistry, chief geologist and exploration manager for Latin America and the far east, retiring from that post in 1981. Among his several industry-related honors were the AAPG President's Award and also AAPG Distinguished Lecturer (1972–73).

== Return to Research ==
From 1981 to 1985, Bill conducted independent research on foraminiferal ecology in his personal laboratory in Barnstable, Massachusetts, near Woods Hole where he long had had similarly interested associates. Throughout that period, and later, he returned to Scripps on extended visits to conduct studies with Fred Phleger and Wolf Berger.

Returning full-time to academia in September 1985, Bill joined Northwestern University in Evanston, Illinois, as adjunct professor of in the Department of Geological Sciences, where he brought critical links not only to paleontology but to applied geology to the department. He taught a Senior Linkage Seminar on "The Petroleum Industry: Its Success, Its Problems and Its Future" and continued his studies of foraminiferal ecology and the comparison of modern salinity-dependent phenotypes with those of the geological record. Walton was known to delight students with his rendition "Nothing Could Be Finer Than A Quinqueloculiner In The Morning", sung to the tune of "Carolina in the Morning." In 1990, he published a study of the modern distribution of Ammonia.
