= David Walton =

David Walton may refer to:

- David Walton (economist) (1963–2006), British economist
- Dave Walton (born 1973), English footballer
- David Walton (writer), U.S. writer and critic
- David Walton (science fiction writer) (born 1975), U.S. science fiction and fantasy novelist
- David Walton (actor) (born 1978), played Dr. Rick in Fired Up
- David Walton (ecologist) (1945–2019), British emeritus professor with the British Antarctic Survey
- David Walton (politician), American politician
