= Douglas Walton =

Douglas Walton may refer to:

- Douglas Walton (actor) (1909–1961), Canadian actor
- Doug Walton (cricketer) (1927–2001), Australian cricketer
- Douglas N. Walton (1942–2020), Canadian academic
- Doug Walton (rugby league) (c.1946–2012), English rugby league player

== See also ==
- Albert D. Walton (Albert Douglas Walton, 1886–1951), US Attorney for the state of Wyoming
- Douglas Wolton (1898–1988), British communist activist
