= Joseph Walton (footballer, born 1868) =

English footballer

Personal information
- Full name: Joseph Walton
- Date of birth: 15 December 1868
- Place of birth: Darwen, England
- Date of death: 1940 (aged 71–72)
- Position: Goalkeeper

Senior career*
Years	Team	Apps	(Gls)
1891–1892	Darwen	4	(0)
- * Club domestic league appearances and goals

Joseph Walton (15 December 1868 – 1940) was an English footballer who played in the Football League for Darwen.
