= Timothy Walton =

Timothy Walton may refer to:

- Timothy Walton (cricketer, born 1967), English cricketer who played for Cornwall
- Tim Walton (cricketer, born 1972), English cricketer who played first-class cricket
- Tim Walton (softball) (born 1972), former baseball player and softball coach
- Tim Walton (American football) (born 1971), defensive coordinator
