= William Walton (writer) =

William Walton (1784–1857) was an English writer on Spain and Portugal.

== Life ==
William Walton, consul for Spain in Liverpool, he was sent to Spain and Portugal at an early age to study the languages and train for a business career. Thence via the Spanish American colonies, he became secretary to the British expedition which captured San Domingo from the French in 1802. He remained there as British agent, returning to England in 1809.

Living first in Bristol, and then in London, Walton concentrated on writing about the contemporary politics of Spain and Portugal. For the most part he advocated against the policy pursued by the British ministers. He took an interest in the question of naturalising the alpaca, and wrote essays on the subject, the last being in a competition for the medal of the Highland and Agricultural Society in 1841.

Walton died in Oxford on 5 May 1857.

== Works ==
Walton was a prolific writer. His main works were:

- The present State of the Spanish Colonies, including an Account of Hispaniola, London, 1810.
- An Historical and Descriptive Account of the Four Species of Peruvian Sheep, London, 1811.
- An Exposé of the Dissensions of Spanish America, London, 1814.
- The true Interests of the European Powers and of the Empire of Brazil in reference to … Portugal, with other pamphlets, London, 1829.
- Letter to Viscount Goderich respecting the relations of England and Portugal, London, 1830. This was one of a number of letters to statesmen.
- Spain, or who is the lawful Successor to the Throne?, London, 1834.
- Legitimacy the only Salvation of Spain, London, 1835.
- Revolutions of Spain, London, 1837.
- The Alpaca: a Plan for its Naturalisation, London, 1844.

There were other similar political pamphlets, all on Spain and Portugal. Walton also translated works from the French.

== Notes ==
Attribution

This article incorporates text from a publication now in the public domain: Lee, Sidney, ed. (1899). "Walton, William". Dictionary of National Biography. Vol. 59. London: Smith, Elder & Co.
