= Asmaa Walton =

Asmaa Walton is an art educator and founder of the Black Art Library, a collection of resources about Black visual artists.

== Early life and education ==
Walton grew up in Detroit. Although she frequently spent time in the Detroit Institute of Arts, she lacked arts education in school. She attended a culinary school before enrolling at Michigan State University. After graduating with a BFA in art education, she then completed a master's degree in arts politics from New York University. She was the KeyBank Diversity Leadership Fellow at the Toledo Museum of Art and the Saint Louis Art Museum’s 2019-2020 Romare Bearden Graduate Museum Fellow.

== Black Art Library ==
Walton noticed that there were few works on display by Black artists in major museums, and that few Black visitors found these museums accessible. In an effort to improve arts education, she founded the Black Art Library during Black History Month in 2020, posting images of books and resources about Black visual culture and Black aesthetics to an Instagram account. She eventually collected over 200 resources. Walton created the online project for people seeking to know more about Black art, which is often excluded from the permanent collections of museums: "I really wanted to create a resource for our education. I wanted Black people to be able to use this resource and find an interest in art, or to do research, or just sit down and learn some things they might have already known but learn some new information about it."

While the project was digital in its first iteration, Walton opened a physical pop-up version of the Black Art Library in Highland Park, Michigan, in summer 2020. It was then displayed at the Museum of Contemporary Art Detroit from January 21 to April 18, 2021. Walton sees the archive as a "hybrid" community space where people can be comfortable while learning. Visitors can interact with and touch artist monographs, exhibition catalogs, children's books, artist memoirs, artist biographies, art history texts, and other art-related ephemera.

In 2021, Walton collaborated with Bottega Veneta, the Italian luxury fashion house, on a Black Art Library display at a pop-up store in Detroit. Walton was also named as a contributor to the Shepherd, a new arts complex in Detroit. A version of the Black Art Library at the Shepherd will be called the East Village Arts Library.
