= Alice Walton (classicist) =

American classical archaeologist

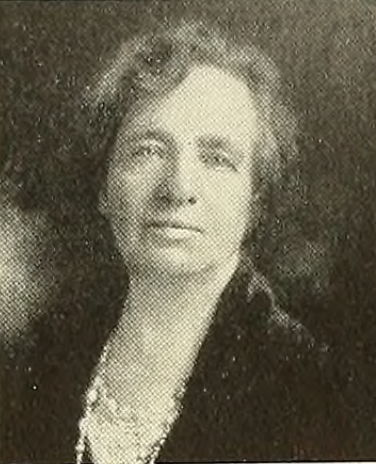
- Alice Walton, from the 1929 yearbook of Wellesley College
- Born: January 13, 1865; Lawrence, Massachusetts, United States
- Died: January 26, 1954 (aged 89); Boston, United States
- Occupations: Lecturer; Academic; Archaeologist

Academic background
- Education: Cornell University
- Thesis: The Cult of Asklepios (1892)

Academic work
- Discipline: Classics; Archaeology
- Institutions: Dwight School; Wellesley College

Mary Alice Walton (1865–1954) was an American classicist and archaeologist and Professor Emerita of Latin at Wellesley College. She was "prominent among the first generation of American women who combined a close knowledge of the ancient sites with teaching in a women's college".

== Early life and education ==
Walton was born in Lawrence, Massachusetts, the daughter of George Augustus Walton and Electa Noble Lincoln Walton. Her father was an educator and education official, and her mother was a noted clubwoman and suffragist. She graduated from Smith College in 1887, and gained her PhD in 1892, from Cornell University, with a thesis on the cult of Asclepius. Her thesis was reissued in 1979, after her death as "Asclepios: the Cult of the Greek God of Medicine".

== Career ==
Following her doctoral studies, Walton was a Fellow of the American School of Classical Studies at Athens from 1892 to 1894 and from 1895 to 1896, returning again from 1910 to 1911. She also served as a Fellow in the American Academy in Rome in the 1903–04 and 1922–23 academic years. She taught archaeology and classics primarily in schools and colleges for women. She worked in Worcester, Massachusetts from 1888 to 1890, before moving to New York to work in Sach's Schools for Girls (later the Dwight School).

In 1896 she returned to Massachusetts to Wellesley College where she remained for the rest of her career teaching classics, ancient art, Latin, and archaeology. In 1902 she was made Associate Professor of Latin and Archaeology, gaining her full Professorship in Latin in 1915. Walton was also the Chair of the Latin department at Wellesley from 1916 to 1917, and again in 1929. She retired from Wellesley in 1933, with emerita status.

Walton was one of the early members of the Classical Association of New England (CANE) and served as its president from 1914 to 1915. She was also a founder and active member of the Classical Club of Greater Boston.

== Personal life ==
Walton died in 1954, at the age of 89, in Boston.

== Select publications ==
- Walton, A. 1900. "Some Transformations of Antiquity," The Wellesley Magazine 8, 159–65.
- Walton, A. 1904. "'Calynthus' or Calamis", American Journal of Archaeology 8, 460–2.
- Walton, A. 1906. "The Classics as a Means of Training in English", Bulletin of the Classical Association of New England 1, 29–31.
- Walton, A. 1907. "An Unpublished Amphora and an Eye Cylix signed by Amasis in the Boston Museum", American Journal of Archaeology 11, 150–9.
- Walton, A. 1916. "Painted Marbles from Thessaly", Art and Archaeology 4, 47–53.
- Walton, A. 1924. "The Date of the Arch of Constantine", Memoirs of the American Academy at Rome 4, 169–180.
