= William Walton (painter) =

American journalist and painter (1909–94)

- Born: William Edwin Walton; August 20, 1909; Jacksonville, Illinois, United States
- Died: December 18, 1994 (aged 85); New York City, New York, United States
- Known for: Painting, journalism
- Movement: Abstract expressionism

William Edwin Walton (August 20, 1909 – December 18, 1994) was an American journalist and abstract expressionist painter. He was a confidant of President John F. Kennedy and Jacqueline Kennedy, and chaired the U.S. Commission of Fine Arts from 1963 to 1971.

== Early life and career ==
Walton was born on August, 20, 1909, (Note: One source lists the date of birth as 1910. Walton's own statement to U.S. immigration authorities in 1945 had his date of birth as August 20, 1909.) in Jacksonville, Illinois, to Joseph William and Helen Louise Weller Walton. He was the youngest of three children, and had two older sisters, Helen and Ruth. His father owned and published the Jacksonville Journal-Courier, the local newspaper. His grandfather, Edwin Weller, was one of the first volunteers to serve in the Union Army in the American Civil War. Edwin later married Antoinette Watkins. As a boy, Walton often spent his summers on a relative's farm near Charlevoix, Michigan.

Walton attended and graduated from the University of Wisconsin. He worked for his father's newspaper after college, then got a job with the Associated Press. He moved to Springfield, Illinois, and then to Chicago before moving to New York City. Walton later worked for PM, a leftist newspaper in New York City.

=== Friendship with Hemingway ===
When World War II broke out, Walton began working for Time magazine. Walton met journalist Mary Welsh while they both worked for Time in England. Although he liked her and enjoyed her writing, he felt she lacked insight into the deeper meaning of the events she was covering. When Walton received permission to parachute into Normandy on D-Day and was training for the jump, Welsh invited him to a May 24 party at the London apartment of Robert Capa, the Hungarian war photographer. Capa had also invited Ernest Hemingway to the party. Although Welsh was not present, a mutual friend of hers introduced Walton to Hemingway. Hemingway and Walton soon became good friends, in part because Hemingway was fascinated by Walton's forthcoming parachute jump. Walton parachuted into France with the 82nd Airborne Division on June 6. Hemingway gained access to liberated France shortly thereafter. When Walton was staying in Cherbourg in mid-July, Hemingway visited him numerous times under the pretense of bringing him his mail. Hemingway, Capa, and Walton also spent a week at newly liberated Mont Saint-Michel in August 1944, drinking and eating as much as they could. Hemingway and Walton accompanied one another during the first phase of the Battle of Hürtgen Forest in September and October 1944. They even shared a double-bed.

During lulls in the shelling, Hemingway repeatedly told Walton how much he hated his mother. Hemingway loathed her because she had accepted money from him, even while she condemned the books he wrote on moral grounds. Hemingway later saved Walton's life during the battle. Hemingway recognized the sound of an oncoming German plane, and threw Walton out of the jeep they were riding in just moments before it was strafed. The two men parted, but met again on New Year's Eve in London. Walton told Hemingway that he was going to have dinner with Hemingway's wife, Martha Gellhorn. Hemingway and Gellhorn were on the verge of divorce after several rocky years of marriage. Hemingway invited himself to the dinner. Hemingway ridiculed and taunted his wife all night, and Walton stood up for her. In the early hours of the next morning, Hemingway stripped to his underwear, put a bucket on his head, and banged on Gellhorn's door with a mop, demanding to be let in. Walton moved into the Hôtel Ritz in Paris in January 1945, covering the war from the liberated city. Hemingway, now openly dating Mary Welsh even though his divorce was not yet final, was in one of the happiest moods of his life. He bragged openly to Walton about his powerful sex life and happiness.

Despite the friendship Walton felt for Hemingway, he was also critical of his behavior. He felt Hemingway was a hypocrite for deriding religion, all the while acting like a "medieval peasant" when it came to the beliefs and rituals of Hemingway's Roman Catholic faith. He also witnessed Hemingway repeatedly making the sign of the cross and triple-knocking on wood (a sign of belief in the Trinity) many times. Nonetheless, Walton also played a critical role in helping to secure Hemingway's legacy. Hemingway committed suicide on July 2, 1961, while most of his effects and papers were still at the Hemingway farm, Finca Vigía, in Cuba. But a Communist government had seized power in Cuba, and the United States had cut off diplomatic relations with the Cuban government in 1960. American citizens were banned from traveling to the island. Walton used his connections with President John F. Kennedy to help Mary Hemingway obtain a passport to Cuba to retrieve her husband's effects and papers. Later, Walton convinced Mary Hemingway that her husband's papers should be deposited at the John F. Kennedy Presidential Library and Museum.

== Friendship with and political work for John F. Kennedy ==
Walton moved to Washington, D.C., in late 1946. He had been assigned by Time as its Washington correspondent. While in this position, he also worked briefly as an editor with The New Republic in 1948. In 1949, William Walton abandoned journalism for painting. He worked primarily in abstract expressionism, although he also painted in other styles. His work was collected by the Corcoran Gallery of Art and the Phillips Collection, and shown at galleries in Washington and New York. Several important private art collectors also purchased his work.

Walton lived in a large brick home at 2903 P Street NW in the Georgetown neighborhood. One of his neighbors was Sen. John F. Kennedy, and Walton and the Kennedys became good friends. Kennedy nicknamed him "Billy Boy", while Jacqueline Kennedy called Walton "Baron" or "Czar". Walton introduced the Kennedys to Washington Post publisher Katharine Graham. Kennedy also collected some of Walton's paintings.

Walton played a key role in Kennedy's 1960 presidential campaign. He volunteered to work on the campaign in the spring of 1960, long before most people believed Kennedy had a chance at the nomination. During the 1960 Democratic presidential primaries, he helped run the Kennedy campaign operation in West Virginia and Wisconsin. In the general election campaign, he had overall control of the Kennedy operation in New York, the most populous state, where the state Democratic Party was in disarray. Robert F. Kennedy sent Walton to New York to stabilize the campaign there. New York City reporter William Haddad had begun writing articles critical of Mayor Robert F. Wagner Jr. that threatened to divide the New York state Democratic Party. Walton neutralized the problem by hiring Haddad as an aide to Robert Kennedy. Walton's organizational skills allowed him to rise quickly within the Kennedy organization, and he was given election assignments in Maine and California. Walton was also one of the few people who knew that John Kennedy was in poor health during the campaign. Kennedy suffered from back problems, a deteriorating left knee, Addison's disease, and a possible addiction to amphetamines (which led to withdrawal effects). Walton witnessed Kennedy being followed throughout the campaign by an aide with a kit full of medication designed to treat Kennedy's illnesses.

By the end of the campaign, Walton was considered one of Kennedy's closest associates. He was one of the few people allowed to watch election returns with Kennedy and his family on election night in 1960. He also was one of the few people allowed to have dinner with Kennedy the night after the election. During this dinner, Walton unsuccessfully pressed Kennedy to fire J. Edgar Hoover as Director of the Federal Bureau of Investigation. Walton was also the only Kennedy advisor permitted to join the president-elect at a critical post-election meeting with Eleanor Roosevelt. Kennedy later moved his transition headquarters from his own home at 3307 N Street NW into Walton's residence. (Note: Walton was so poor at the time that the rooms in his house were only lightly furnished. The rent from Kennedy's transition team helped Walton financially.)

=== Role in Kennedy's funeral ===
Gregarious, intelligent, educated, and world-wise, William Walton was considered the most popular of Kennedy's friends and confidants. He frequently escorted Jacqueline Kennedy to social functions and engagements when President Kennedy's duties kept him away. But since Walton had no official political role in the Kennedy administration, he remained unknown to most of the public. He was often confused with the British composer William Walton. Walton's obscurity prompted the poet Frank O'Hara to write a poem about that.

One of the more public roles Walton performed in the first few months of the Kennedy administration was redecorating the White House. Walton advised Jacqueline Kennedy on the building's decor, and helped redecorate the Oval Office with sculpture and paintings. Although Walton differed with the president on political issues−he was an early opponent of the Vietnam War−the Kennedys enjoyed his company immensely. The Kennedys invited Walton to spend their first White House Thanksgiving day with them in 1961.

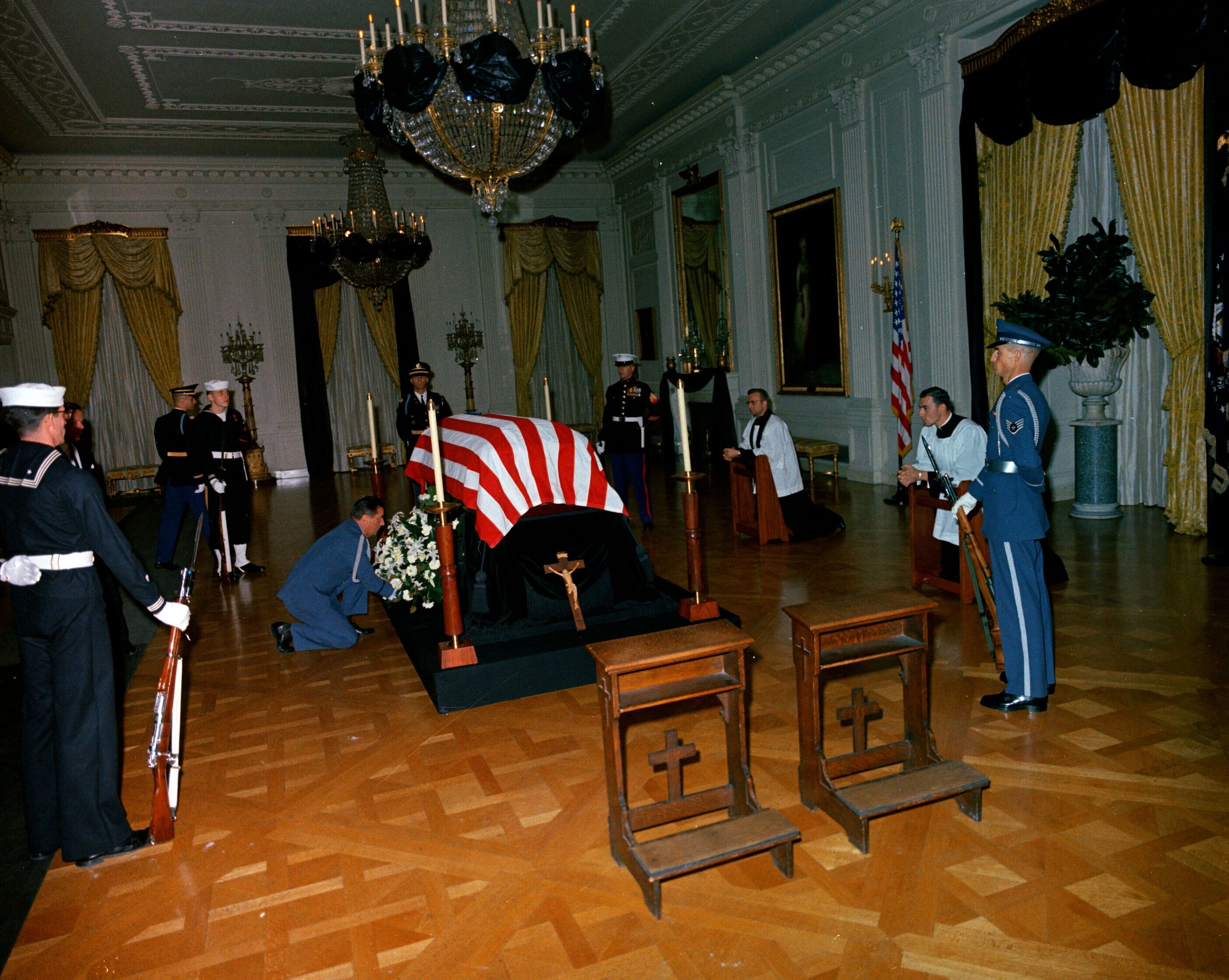
The body of John F. Kennedy in repose in the White House on November 23, 1963. William Walton helped research the funerary decorations for the room and the dressing for the catafalque.

Walton also played a critical role following the assassination of John F. Kennedy on November 22, 1963. His body was taken to Bethesda Naval Hospital in Bethesda, Maryland, for an autopsy. Jacqueline and Robert F. Kennedy were escorted to a VIP suite on the 17th floor of the hospital. As the evening wore on, the family began making plans for the funeral. Jacqueline Kennedy vaguely remembered an engraving of the catafalque on which President Abraham Lincoln's coffin had rested while he lay in repose. Robert Kennedy telephoned the White House, and at about 10:00 P.M. relayed the message that Mrs. Kennedy wanted the same bier. Officials at the Library of Congress quickly looked up reports of Lincoln's funeral, and a Lincoln funeral scholar identified the most accurate ones. Walton looked at a copy of Frank Leslie's Illustrated Newspaper and Harper's Weekly, chose an engraving from Harper's, and began sketching the bier and funerary decorations. Military carpenters, unaware that the original Lincoln catafalque was stored in the Capitol building and that a replica was also available, began constructing one from Walton's sketches.

During the early hours of November 23, Walton assembled a decorating staff out of presidential aides, military officers, White House butlers, and others, and began draping the East Room windows and chandeliers in black crepe. Walton realized that the engraving in Harper's Weekly depicted an overwrought display, so he decided that only borders of black crepe would be appropriate. The White House had a large supply on hand to reupholster furniture, and additional material was quickly obtained from a local fabric shop. The chandeliers were finished by 11:00 P.M., as Walton had been told that Kennedy's body would arrive by then. With the autopsy still continuing, Walton next decorated the windows and mantels over the doors. While Sargent Shriver and others removed the grand piano from the room at about 1:40 A.M., Walton helped assemble the catafalque, which had been arriving in pieces since midnight. To make the catafalque look less barren, he ordered staff to cut magnolia leaves and branches from trees on the White House grounds and fill one of the East Room's flower urns with it. Walton rejected the candlesticks, satin backgrounds, and 5 feet (1.5 m) wooden cross brought for the lying-in-repose by Gawler's Funeral Home, and accepted just two prie-dieu (wooden desks at which people could kneel and pray). Walton also rejected silver candlesticks from the Cathedral of St. Matthew the Apostle, but accepted two wooden ones from Saint Stephen Martyr Catholic Church. A large silver crucifix with a golden Christ from St. Matthew's was rejected by Walton in favor of a black Benedictine crucifix with a realistic, wooden Christ owned by Shriver.

Walton also ordered the storm door at the entrance to the White House beneath the North Portico removed so that the coffin would pass more easily through the portal. The door was removed, but the frame (embedded in concrete) was not. Black crepe was tacked around the door to cover it. Shriver had the White House driveway lit with small firepots. Kennedy's body arrived at the White House at about 4:30 A.M. The military casket team moved the coffin into the East Room and set it on the catafalque. Walton gave General Godfrey McHugh, Kennedy's chief military aide, a spray of flowers to place at the long base of the catafalque.

The casket was opened, and after viewing the body Jacqueline Kennedy asked for a closed casket funeral. But she left the final decision to her brother-in-law, Robert Kennedy. Robert Kennedy, Walton, Secretary of Defense Robert McNamara, and four others viewed the body shortly before 5:00 A.M. McNamara said the casket should be kept closed. Walton agreed, which convinced Robert Kennedy that a closed-casket funeral would be held. Walton remembered sleeping as if in a daze for the next few hours.

Walton also played a significant role in choosing the location for Kennedy's burial. While many in the media, Kennedy's family, and the Kennedy administration believed that Kennedy would be buried in the family plot in Brookline, Massachusetts, Jacqueline Kennedy and Robert McNamara believed he should be buried at Arlington National Cemetery. In a driving rain, McNamara visited the site early in the morning on Saturday, November 23. After reviewing three sites (one of which was the lawn below Arlington House) with cemetery superintendent John C. Metzler Sr., McNamara returned around mid-morning with Robert Kennedy, Kennedy's sisters Jean Smith and Pat Lawford, and Walton. After reviewing all three sites, the group agreed on the Arlington House lawn. Walton was one of the first to speak in favor of the lawn site, and pointed to a site higher up the hill where he thought the grave should be. During a third trip that afternoon, McNamara and Walton accompanied Jacqueline Kennedy to the site. Walton again pointed to where the president should be buried, and others noted that Walton had instinctively chosen a plot along the axis between Arlington House and the Lincoln Memorial. Walton's reckoning was so good, his preferred site was only 6 inches (15 cm) off the axis line.

That afternoon, as planning for Kennedy's state funeral got underway, White House aide Ralph Dungan was unable to control the many emotional people proposing excessive and outlandish funeral tributes. General McHugh, for example, proposed sending Air Force One roaring along the length of Arlington Memorial Bridge at just 500 feet (150 m). An exasperated Dungan turned the meeting over to Walton. Within just a few hours, Walton had gotten the group to give up on nearly all the inappropriate funeral tributes and achieved consensus on an outline for Kennedy's funeral. The one misstep Walton made occurred when Jacqueline Kennedy proposed an eternal flame over her husband's grave. Walton called this idea "aesthetically unfortunate" and attempted to get her to give it up. He was unsuccessful. He later came to agree that the John F. Kennedy Eternal Flame was an appropriate and even moving memorial. As chairman of the Commission of Fine Arts, he helped shepherd the Kennedy grave site design through the approval process in 1964.

== Chairman of the Commission on Fine Arts ==
In June 1963, the terms of six of the seven members of the U.S. Commission of Fine Arts expired. Kennedy had already appointed landscape architect Hideo Sasaki, to the commission in 1962. Kennedy privately criticized the Eisenhower commission for "spread[ing] a mantle of mediocrity and middle age over the city", and he was now determined to remake the CFA into a body that would promote modern ideas of art and architecture. Walton advised Kennedy on whom to appoint to the CFA. The new commissioners included architect Gordon Bunshaft, architect Burnham Kelly, architect John Carl Warnecke (a friend of the Kennedys), sculptor Theodore Roszak, and art critic Aline B. Saarinen. Although Walton himself did not lobby for a position, Kennedy named him to the commission as well. Kennedy warned him, however, that the administration had limited political capital to spend on the arts and that Walton should never put Kennedy in a position where the president would have to go out on a limb to rescue him. Walton's chairmanship was easy-going. His leadership style was informal and collegial, and he pushed the commission to shape and prod designers rather than tell them what to do.

During Walton's tenure on the CFA, he helped to save the historic buildings around Lafayette Square. Various plans for the city included razing the historic old homes around the square, such as the Cutts-Madison House and the Tayloe House. Although demolition of the structures around the square was due to begin in 1962, Jacqueline Kennedy wanted the buildings saved. "The wreckers haven't started yet, and until they do it can be saved," she wrote. Mrs. Kennedy enlisted her architect friend, John Carl Warnecke, to design new buildings that would preserve and integrate the historic structures. Warnecke conceived the basic design over a single weekend, and worked closely with Mrs. Kennedy over the next few months to formalize the design proposal. The design was presented to the public and the Commission of Fine Arts in October 1962, and with Mrs. Kennedy's backing the commission adopted the revised Warnecke design proposal. Over the next few years, Walton shepherded the design through the CFA, working closely with Jacqueline Kennedy throughout the process. Walton won restoration of the historic buildings and forced the redesign of the square so that its pathways matched the facades of the new buildings facing it.

When some influential members of Congress proposed extending the west front of the U.S. Capitol building, Walton had the CFA commission an engineering study that directly challenged the studies supporting the extension which were published by the Architect of the Capitol. Through the 1960s, Walton continued to oppose the west front extension. He also opposed construction of the Inner Loop—two planned circumferential freeways around downtown Washington, D.C., which had first been proposed in the 1950s. D.C. residents were strongly opposed to both inner loops, upset that the freeways required the demolition of large numbers of houses and would greatly affect many city neighborhoods. Although Walton was not opposed to improving traffic flow and patterns in the city, he did not like the idea of a freeway less than a mile from the White House. "It seems madness to speed cars at 50 miles an hour right through the heart of the capital of this country," he said in 1965. Nonetheless, he voted repeatedly to approve portions of the Inner Loop plan, so long as they were carefully designed. For example, Walton approved the construction of a six-lane freeway tunnel under the Tidal Basin and Jefferson Memorial because it freed up many acres of land aboveground. He opposed, however, the construction of a tunnel under the Lincoln Memorial because it would have killed numerous old trees and its exhaust chimneys would have been an eyesore. Walton also argued for mass transit to receive as much attention as highways from transportation planners.

During Walton's first term as CFA chairman, the commission became an increasingly powerful and influential voice on design issues in Washington, D.C. Walton's first term on the CFA expired in June 1967. President Lyndon B. Johnson hesitated at first to rename him because the terms of six of the commission's members were expiring at one time and Johnson said he wanted to stagger the commissioners' terms. But Johnson realized Walton was an effective administrator, and reappointed Walton in July 1967. He also appointed John Walker, the director of the National Gallery of Art, and Chloethiel Woodard Smith, a prominent local architect. (Johnson previously reappointed Hideo Sasaki in 1966.) Johnson asked the three remaining members of the CFA to serve without reappointment for a year, at which time their commissions would expire.

During his second term as chairman of the Commission on Fine Arts, Walton oversaw the approval of I. M. Pei's design for the East Wing of the National Gallery of Art and the restoration of the Renwick Gallery. He dissented from the commission's approval of Pei's building, but Pei also implemented many of Walton's critiques. Although Walton voted to approve both buildings, he strongly disliked the design of the J. Edgar Hoover Building and had serious concerns about the initial designs for Gyo Obata's National Air and Space Museum. He also played a critical if minor role in the design of the Washington Metro. The CFA repeatedly criticized the designs of architect Harry Weese, who had been hired to design the city's new subway stations. Numerous meetings were held in which Weese's designs were found to fall short. In January 1968, Walton presided at yet another meeting between the CFA and Weese. At this meeting, Weese appeared unable to respond to or understand any of the commission's comments or suggestions. An exasperated Gordon Bunshaft rose, and—in front of a shocked Weese—began sketching out on a large easel what came to be the Brutalist design for Washington's Metro stations. As the meeting broke up, with the design appearing to have won over the CFA, Walton quipped, "Well Gordon, since you've designed the subway so far, I think you might as well continue with the project!" Although Weese is credited with the design of the Washington Metro stations, it was Walton's support that led the CFA to approve the design outlined by Bunshaft.

As Walton's second term on the CFA came to an end in 1971, he was praised for his leadership of the commission. Washington Post architectural critic Wolf Von Eckardt said Walton's CFA had "probably done more advising than at any time in its history", and that it had brought "a fresh and contemporary" vision to architecture in the nation's capital. Walton gave a freer rein to Gordon Bunshaft, who was much more aggressive and brusque during Walton's second term than the first. At the same time, Walton himself became a trusted advisor to Lady Bird Johnson, helping strengthen her city beautification efforts and giving them a political boost.

Walton's term on the Commission of Fine Arts expired in July 1971. J. Carter Brown was named his successor as chairman.

Walton remained generally active in the arts during his eight years on the CFA. He advocated for increased government spending on the arts, and was a member of the Temporary Commission on Pennsylvania Avenue which oversaw the redevelopment of Pennsylvania Avenue National Historic Site. He continued to paint as well, with gallery shows in New York City in the spring of 1963 and at the Corcoran Gallery of Art in December 1964. In 1966, he published a book, The Evidence of Washington, which contained essays on and photographs of the city.

=== Secret diplomatic mission ===
In 1963, William Walton went on a secret diplomatic mission to the Soviet Union just eight days after John F. Kennedy's assassination. Walton went to the USSR on a public mission to discuss architectural and art exchanges. But at the behest of Robert F. Kennedy, he secretly met with Georgi Bolshakov, a Soviet journalist and spy who served as a backdoor channel between the Kennedy administration and the Soviet government. Walton carried a message for the Soviets from Robert Kennedy: Although President Lyndon Johnson was a "sabre-rattling anti-communist", Kennedy assured the Soviets that Johnson was nothing more than a "clever time-server incapable of realizing Kennedy's unfinished plans". Kennedy also informed the Soviets through Walton that he intended to run for president in 1968, and that if he won there would be a significant thaw in U.S.-Soviet relations. Finally, Walton conveyed the Kennedy family's belief that John F. Kennedy had been the victim of a vast right-wing conspiracy and not a Soviet assassination.

Walton's mission, conducted without the knowledge of the U.S. government, represented a major diplomatic breach and did not become public knowledge until 1997, when Soviet archives became available to U.S. historians.

== Later life and death ==
In 1975, after leaving government service, Walton moved to New York City and resumed his painting career. He also purchased a home in Stone Ridge, New York.

In the 1970s, William Walton was named a trustee of the John F. Kennedy Presidential Library and Museum. His connection with the Kennedy family remained strong throughout the 1970s and 1980s. In 1979, Walton came into possession of love letters written by his grandfather to his grandmother. He showed them to Jacqueline Kennedy Onassis and asked if they could be turned into a book. She helped get them published and assisted Walton whenever obstacles arose. The letters were published as A Civil War Courtship: The Letters of Edwin Weller From Antietam to Atlanta. Walton continued to write articles about art and architecture during this period for magazines like House and Garden and Town and Country. He also served on the board of directors of the Cafritz Foundation.

Walton suffered a heart attack in 1993. He died in his sleep on December 18, 1994, at his home in the Chelsea neighborhood. The Washington Post speculated that he succumbed to heart problems.

== Personal life ==
William Walton married Emily Ann Lillie, daughter of noted zoologist Frank Rattray Lillie, on September 9, 1935. The couple had two children, Frances and Matthew. They divorced in 1948. (Note: Emily Lillie moved to St. Louis, Missouri, where she met former British soldier Ian Cramer. They married in 1950. She died in 1999, and he followed in 2001.)

Walton's sexuality has been the subject of speculation. In the 1960s, many Washington insiders assumed he was homosexual. Walton was well known as a "beard" and "safe" date, and was frequently asked to escort married and unmarried women to White House and government functions. Artist Alice Neel, who painted numerous portraits of gay men, depicted him with rolled-up sleeves and an oversized watch band, coded indications of his homosexuality, and the painting has been read as a political commentary on homophobia. Modern historians such as C. David Heymann and Greg Lawrence state outright that Walton was gay.

== Depictions ==
In Pablo Larraín's Jackie, Walton is played by Richard E. Grant.

== Bibliography ==
- Allara, Pamela and Neel, Alice. Pictures of People: Alice Neel's American Portrait Gallery. Hanover, N.H.: University Press of New England, 1998.
- Anthony, Carl Sferrazza. As We Remember Her: Jacqueline Kennedy Onassis in the Words of Her Family and Friends. Reprint ed. New York: HarperCollins, 2003.
- Anthony, Kathryn H. Designing for Diversity: Gender, Race, and Ethnicity in the Architectural Profession. Urbana, Ill.: University of Illinois Press, 2001.
- Bryer, Jackson Robert; Margolies, Alan; and Prigozy, Ruth. F. Scott Fitzgerald: New Perspectives. Athens Ga.: University of Georgia Press, 2000.
- Bugliosi, Vincent. Four Days in November: The Assassination of President John F. Kennedy. New York: W.W. Norton & Co., 2007.
- Burleigh, Nina. A Very Private Woman: The Life and Unsolved Murder of Presidential Mistress Mary Meyer. New York: Bantam Books, 1999.
- Burwell, Rose Marie. Hemingway: The Postwar Years and the Posthumous Novels. Cambridge: Cambridge University Press, 1996.
- David, Lester. Jacqueline Kennedy Onassis: A Portrait of Her Private Years. New York: Carol Publishing, 1994.
- Douglass, James W. JFK and the Unspeakable: Why He Died and Why It Matters. New York: Simon and Schuster, 2010.
- Gilbert, Robert E. The Mortal Presidency: Illness and Anguish in the White House. New York: Fordham University Press, 1998.
- Heymann, C. David. Bobby and Jackie: A Love Story. New York: Simon and Schuster, 2009.
- Kennon, Donald R. The United States Capitol: Designing and Decorating a National Icon. Athens, Ohio: Ohio University Press, 2000.
- Lawrence, Greg. Jackie As Editor: The Literary Life of Jacqueline Kennedy Onassis. New York: Thomas Dunne Books, 2011.
- Leaming, Barbara. Mrs. Kennedy: The Missing History of the Kennedy Years. New York: Simon and Schuster, 2011.
- Luebke, Thomas E., ed. Civic Art: A Centennial History of the U.S. Commission of Fine Arts. Washington, D.C.: U.S. Commission of Fine Arts, 2013.
- Lynn, Kenneth Schuyler. Hemingway. Cambridge, Mass.: Harvard University Press, 2002.
- Manchester, William. The Death of a President, November 20-November 25, 1963. New York: Harper & Row, 1967.
- Marton, Kati. Hidden Power: Presidential Marriages That Shaped Our Recent History. New York: Random House, 2001.
- Meyers, Jeffrey. Hemingway: A Biography. New York: Da Capo Press, 1999.
- O'Hara, Frank and Allen, Donald. The Collected Poems of Frank O'Hara. Berkeley, Calif.: University of California Press, 1995.
- Reeves, Richard. President Kennedy: Profile of Power. New York: Simon and Schuster, 2011.
- Schlesinger, Arthur M. Robert Kennedy and His Times. Boston: Houghton Mifflin, 1978.
- Schrag, Zachary M. The Great Society Subway: A History of the Washington Metro. Baltimore, Md.: Johns Hopkins University Press, 2006.
- Smith, Sally Bedell. Grace and Power: The Private World of the Kennedy White House. New York: Ballantine Books, 2006.
- Weller, Ralph H. The Hieronimus Weller Family in America. Alcove, N.Y.: R.H. Weller, 1999.
- Whelan, Richard. Robert Capa: A Biography. Lincoln, Neb.: University of Nebraska Press, 1994.
- White, Theodore. The Making of the President, 1960. New York: Harper, 1961.
