= William Walton (merchant) =

American merchant (1706–1768)

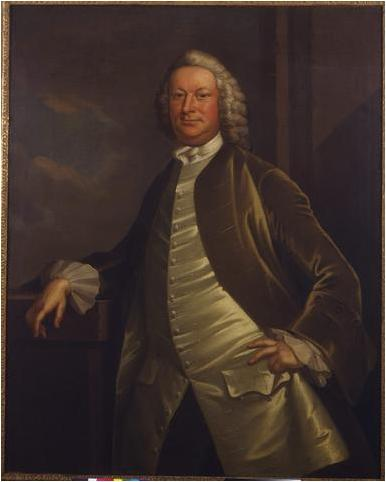
William Walton of New York (1706–1768)

William Walton (1706–1768) was an American merchant and politician. The son of Captain William and Mary (Santford) Walton, he followed his father into the shipping and mercantile business and became a prominent figure in the colony of New York, serving as a member of the New York General Assembly (1751–58) and of the Governor's Council (1758–68). He was one of the founders and a trustee of the New York Society Library and a member of the Board of Trade from 1758 until his death in 1768.

The family of William Walton acquired its fortune in part through an advantageous contract to furnish provisions and supplies to the Spaniards at St. Augustine, Florida. His father, the captain, was an enterprising builder of vessels, as well as a shipper of goods, and appears also to have sailed his own vessels on trading voyages to the West Indies and to the Spanish Main.

Captain William Walton brought 457 Africans to New York, more than any other slave trader; in 1717 and 1721 he transported 217 people from coastal Africa in voyages organized with his London partners.

William the son married Cornelia, daughter of Dr. William Beekman and Catharine Peters de la Noy, on January 27, 1731. His brother Jacob had, five years previously, married Maria, the sister of Dr. William Beekman, and daughter of Gerard Beekman and Magdalen Abeel. The two brothers were in partnership until the death of Jacob, in 1749.

A son of the latter, whose name was William also, became the favorite and heir of the uncle. It was he, the younger William Walton, who in 1757, married the daughter of Lt. Governor De Lancey, whose fortune was equal to his own. William Walton the elder was genial and a brilliant conversationalist. Dining was his principal pleasure, and he entertained many important personages from Europe when they visited New York. He was regarded as the first merchant of his time, and as a prominent legislator and an honored counselor. He died childless in 1768.

== Walton family enterprise ==
Coat of Arms of William Walton

For more than a hundred years the Walton family of merchants held the first place among the shipping magnates of New York City. The Waltons were of English origin, and probably came from the County of Norfolk. Two families of the name appear at about the same period, the one in New York, the other in Richmond County, Staten Island.

In the New York branch of the family the name William was carried through a full century. The first William Walton of whom mention is made, was born in the latter part of the 17th century, about 1665. In 1698 he was admitted a Freeman of the City, and in the same year he married Mary Santford. In the census of 1703 he is recorded as the head of a family, composed of "1 Male, 1 Female, 2 Children, and 1 Negro". His name appears upon the list of subscriptions towards finishing the steeple of Trinity Church in 1711.

On October 13, 1712, Andrew Faneuil, Charles Crommelin, Abraham Van Hoorn and William Walton, merchants of New York and owners of the sloop Swallow, petitioned Governor Hunter for leave to convoy French prisoners to the French West Indies, under a flag of truce. In 1717 and 1721, Walton imported hundreds of slaves in partnership with Nathan Simson of New York and Richard Janeway of London. In 1727 Walton was cited to appear at the office of the Secretary of the Colony, with an inventory of the estate of his son Thomas, deceased. About this time he purchased several lots on Water Street, and established a shipyard. But he was not only a builder of vessels or a shipper of goods; apparently he sailed his own vessels on his trading voyages to the West Indies and the Spanish Main. In April, 1734, an advertisement of the removal of the printer of the New York Gazette shows "Captain Walton" to have resided at that period in Hanover Square.

Historical consensus states that the origin of the fortunes of this enterprising family was the trade preference given, early in the 18th century, to Captain Walton by the Spaniards of St. Augustine and the West Indies. John Pintard relates it as tradition, and John Fanning Watson, in his Annals and Occurrences of New York City and State (1846), tells the same. The printing of the Colonial Manuscripts of New York removed all doubt.

In a letter of Lt. Governor Clarke to the Duke of Newcastle, dated New York, June 2, 1738, in which he announces the receipt of news that a Spanish land and naval force was arrived at St. Augustine from Cuba in order to make a descent upon Georgia, occurs this passage:

The Council were of opinion that there was sufficient cause to embargo Kip and Griffith sloops—both owned by one William Walton, of this town, who, as I am informed, has supplied that place for many years by contract. He protested against the Custom House officers for refusing to clear ships. Captain Walton thought it hard that his vessels entering and clearing for Carolina (as they always do for some English port) should be embargoed, while other vessells that enter for the same place should be suffered to depart; but I can not think it either hard or unjust, Walton being the only person in this place whom the Spaniards permit to trade at Augustine, where he has a Factor who has resided there many years.

The factor, or agent, was the notorious land dealer and smuggler, Jesse Fish. In 1741, Walton's slave, Jupiter, was indicted for his participation in the New York Conspiracy of 1741. On May 25, 1747, The New-York Gazette, Revived in The Weekly Post Boy, contained a notice of the death of the old seaman and entrepreneur at age 82: "Saturday last, departed this life, Capt. William Walton, a very eminent merchant in this city."

His wife survived him many years. Hugh Gaine's New York Mercury of September 12, 1768, among the obituaries, announces, "The 3rd instant, Madam Walton, of this city in the 90th year of her age." Thus William Walton, by his wife Mary Santford, left two sons, Jacob and William, the latter of whom rose quickly to posts of great distinction in the colony, and added largely to the family wealth. William Walton, the younger of the sons, appears also as sailing his father's vessels. He thus acquired the title of captain, by which he is sometimes called.

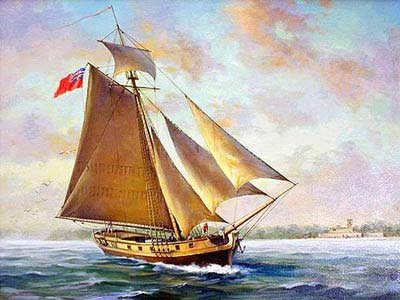
The sloop Industry, owned by the Walton Company of New York City, ran aground on the St. Augustine bar in 1764.

In the New York Weekly Post Boy of June 11, 1744, among the Inward Entries is the report of the ship Mermaid, William Walton (master), from North Carolina, and among the Clearances on the 6 February, 1746, that of the ship William and Mary, William Walton (master), for Curaçao. Whether this was the father or the son is not certain; but it is unlikely that the father would have exposed himself in sea-voyages at his advanced age.

After their father's death, the two brothers formed a partnership; on May 26, 1747, Jacob and William Walton appear as merchants and owners of the ship Mary Magdalen. They continued the profitable business established by their enterprising father, and enjoyed the "preferences" which had been granted to him by the Spaniards of South America and Cuba. The brothers further united their interests by matrimonial alliances with the same family. As appears by the records of the Dutch Reformed Church, Jacob Walton married on May 14, 1726, Maria, daughter of Gerard Beekman and Magdalen Abeel, and William Walton, on January 27, 1731, married Cornelia, daughter of Dr. William Beekman and Catharine Peters de la Noy. Cornelia was the niece of the woman who had married the elder brother.

The partnership of the two brothers was soon ended by the death of Jacob, the elder, on October 17, 1749. He was then in his 47th year, and left behind him a large family to the care of their uncle William, who had no children of his own. The surviving brother, still among the leading merchants of the city, continued to carry on the business of the family in partnership with some of his nephews, as the firm of William Walton & Company.

On the 17th December, 1757, Walton applied for a commission as Captain of the ship William and Mary, 10 guns; and on the March 24, 1762, the firm made the same request for Capt. Jonathan Lawrence, of the sloop Live Oak, 10 guns. While thus adding to their fleet of vessels, they kept up the lucrative trade with the southern ports of the continent, the Spanish West Indies, and the Spanish Main. Their old friends in Spanish Florida still gave them the sole preference of their trade. On June 3, 1757, Lt. Governor De Lancey informed the Lords of Trade that Sir Charles Hardy (the Governor) had desired him to transmit to their Lordships "copies of the Memorial of Mr. Walton to him, of the 29th of January, praying leave to continue supplies to the Spanish Garrison at St. Augustine, according to his Contract with the Government and Royal Officers."

== Political career ==
Growing in wealth and power, Walton was now regarded as suitable for political honors. The old New Yorker was commonly known as "Boss Walton". The word Bos then had a meaning in Dutch not now well understood. It was originally Baas, and meant "master". On the election of June, 1751, "for a member to serve in the General Assembly, for the City and County of New York, in the room of David Clarkson, Esq., deceased, Captain William Walton was unanimously chosen." A new summons being issued the next season, he was again re-elected on February 24, 1752, together with Captain Paul Richard, Henry Cruger, and Major Cornelius Von Hoorn, and continued to serve until 1759.

In the Assembly he attached himself to the party of the Lt. Governor, James De Lancey, then the preeminent politician in the province, and Smith relates that he also secured for the De Lancey interest the support of "his cousin," also a William Walton, who sat for Richmond County. This connection with the Lt. Governor led to promotion. On December 3, 1756, Governor Hardy recommended to the Board of Trade, "John Watts, William Walton, and Robert R. Livingston, to supply vacancies which may happen in the Council; these gentlemen are possessed of considerable estate in the Province and . . . fully qualified for the trust."

In the summer of 1757, the favorite nephew, namesake, and heir of William Walton, now Sr, married the daughter of Lt. Governor De Lancey. The next year Walton Sr., received his appointment. He first took his seat at the Council Board on November 14, 1758, and was a constant attendant at its sessions until March 22, 1768, a few months before his death.

The benefit of his political position to his business has been illustrated in the interference of De Lancey with the Home Government. Another instance is recorded: On April 20, 1765, William Walton & Co. applied to Lt. Governor Golden "for a letter to the [British] Governor of Havana, desiring his countenance and aid in collecting divers sums of money due them from officers, soldiers, and inhabitants of St. Augustine." From this it seems that they supplied the whole settlement. Two days later they received a passport for their sloop Live Oak to proceed to Pensacola, touching at Havana.

== The Walton house ==
About the time of his first entrance into political life, William Walton, who had been living in the heart of the city at Hanover Square, resolved to change his residence. In the year 1752 he erected the mansion which bore his name, on one of the lots which he had inherited from his father near the shipyards. The house stood until 1881 as an imposing if shabby relic of the colonial period, in Franklin Square at No. 326 Pearl Street. (in 1752, Pearl was called Queen Street).

An account of the Walton House, written by John Pintard, was published in the New York Mirror of March 17, 1832, with a picture of the building as it then appeared, The mansion was still a fitting testament to the power and wealth of New York's merchant princes of the 18th century, and its approaches suited to its grandeur. Fluted columns, surmounted with armorial bearings, richly carved and ornamented, upheld its broad portico; and the heads of lions, cut from the freestone, looked down from between the windows. Formerly its gardens in the rear extended down to the East River. From Pintard's article:

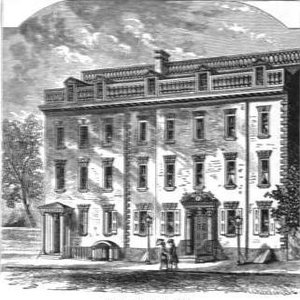
William Walton house

This family dwelling-house was in its day—indeed, still is—a noble specimen of English architecture a century ago. It is a brick edifice, fifty feet in front, and three stories high, built with Holland bricks relieved by brown stone watertables, lentils and jams, (sic) with walls as substantial as many modern churches, standing along the south side of Pearl-street, formerly called Queen Street. The superb staircase in its ample hall, with mahogany handrails and bannisters, by age as dark as ebony, would not disgrace a nobleman's palace. It is the only relic of the kind, that probably at this period remains in the city, the appearance of which affords an air of grandeur not to be seen in the lighter staircases of modern buildings.

This venerable mansion is one of the very few remaining in uninterrupted succession in the family of the original proprietor. It was erected in 1752 by William Walton, Esq., and bequeathed by him to his nephew, the late (honorable) William Walton, whose son, advanced in years, now occupies the premises . . . Mr. Walton was a merchant, and resided in Hanover Square. He acquired an ample fortune by an advantageous contract with some Spaniards at St. Augustine, which enabled him to build by far the most expensive, capacious, elegant house at that period in New York.

== Death ==
Gaine's New York Gazette and Weekly Mercury of July 18, 1768, announced that there "Died on Monday last (July 11th), at his house in this city the Honorable William Walton, Esquire, in the 63d Year of his age. He was one of his Majesty's Council for this Province, and for many Years an Eminent Merchant of this City. His remains were interred in the Family Vault of this City on the Wednesday following."

In his will, Walton ordered that after his wife's death, his household slaves should receive their freedom papers, and an additional annual stipend of £10 or £14. Slave trading was not considered a dishonorable profession in the mid-18th century; records from the British Admiralty list 670 slave ships bound for New York between 1715 and 1765, and some slaves were smuggled into the colonies, but the Waltons' share of that trade was relatively small.

His wife Cornelia survived him many years. When the British took possession of the city, she abandoned her station, and took refuge in "the Jersies", according to an obituary notice in the New York Packet of May 15, 1786. She died in New Jersey on May 10, 1786, at 78 years of age.
