= Thirteen Days =

"Thirteen Days" is often used to denote the period of the Cuban Missile Crisis.

Thirteen Days or 13 Days is also the title of:

- Thirteen Days (book), a 1969 memoir by Robert F. Kennedy of the crisis
- Thirteen Days (film), a 2000 film dealing with the same period
