= Uzel (disambiguation) =

Uzel is a village and commune in France.

Uzel may also refer to:

== People ==
- Ahmet Uzel (1930–1998), Turkish composer
- Jindřich Uzel (1868–1946), Czech entomologist
- Radim Uzel (1940–2022), Czech sexologist

== Other ==
- Uzel (computer), the first digital computer used on Soviet submarines
- Uzel Holding, a former manufacturer in Turkey
