= Infinifilm =

Brand of DVDs

Infinifilm was a brand of specialized DVDs released by New Line Cinema. The namesake feature on DVDs allowed viewers the option to branch off to extra content on the disc relevant to the part of the film currently being viewed (such as deleted scenes, behind-the-scenes clips and cast member interviews). Afterward, the viewer would be returned to the where they left off in the movie. The extra content can also be viewed on their own.

The first Infinifilm DVD release was Thirteen Days in 2001, and the last release was The Number 23 in 2007. Many of the label's films that New Line ported to Blu-ray featuring the original Infinifilm content were rebranded as "Focus Points". New Line then abandoned Infinifilm, most likely due to the 2008 absorption by Warner Bros.

== Releases ==
| Release date | Title |
|---|---|
| July 10, 2001 | Thirteen Days |
| August 14, 2001 | 15 Minutes |
| September 11, 2001 | Blow |
| December 11, 2001 | Rush Hour 2 |
| July 16, 2002 | John Q. |
| December 3, 2002 | Austin Powers in Goldmember |
| March 25, 2003 | Friday After Next |
| June 22, 2003 | Final Destination 2 |
| July 6, 2004 | The Butterfly Effect |
| November 16, 2004 | Elf |
| September 26, 2006 | A Nightmare on Elm Street |
| July 10, 2007 | The Last Mimzy |
| July 24, 2007 | The Number 23 |
