= The Number 23 =

2007 film by Joel Schumacher

- Theatrical release poster
- Directed by: Joel Schumacher
- Written by: Fernley Phillips
- Produced by: Beau Flynn; Tripp Vinson
- Starring: Jim Carrey; Virginia Madsen; Logan Lerman; Danny Huston
- Cinematography: Matthew Libatique
- Edited by: Mark Stevens
- Music by: Harry Gregson-Williams
- Production companies: Contrafilm; Firm Films
- Distributed by: New Line Cinema
- Release date: February 13, 2007
- Running time: 98 minutes
- Country: United States
- Language: English
- Budget: $30 million
- Box office: $77.6 million

The Number 23 is a 2007 American psychological thriller film written by Fernley Phillips and directed by Joel Schumacher. Jim Carrey stars as a man who becomes obsessed with the 23 enigma once he reads about it in a strange book that seemingly mirrors his own life. The film was released in the United States on February 23, 2007, by New Line Cinema. This is the second film to pair Schumacher and Carrey, the first being Batman Forever. The film was a financial success, grossing $77.6 million against a $30 million budget, but received generally negative reviews from critics. Despite this, Carrey was proud of the film, saying: "I was able to explore the darker edges of my personality, which really was a blast and something different for me."

== Plot ==
On Walter Sparrow's birthday (February 3), his wife Agatha gives him The Number 23, a book by Topsy Kretts, as a birthday present. Walter starts reading it and notices similarities between himself and the main character, the detective "Fingerling". Fingerling is obsessed with the 23 enigma, the idea that all incidents and events are connected to the number 23. Walter too becomes obsessed with the number and attempts to uncover the mystery of the book's author, but he cannot find any information. Walter's son, Robin, is interested in the enigma too, but Agatha dismisses it as superstition.

In the book, Fingerling discovers that his lover, Fabrizia, is having an affair and stabs her to death. The police arrest her lover because he found her body and picked up the murder weapon, assuming it was a type of sexual roleplay. Fingerling then prepares to commit suicide by jumping from a hotel balcony, and the book ends abruptly. Walter later learns of Laura Tollins, a murder victim whose body was never found, and whose murder is similar to Fabrizia's death. Walter believes that the man who was sent to prison for Laura's murder, Kyle Flinch, wrote the book. In prison, Walter visits Flinch, who denies killing Laura or writing the book.

Robin discovers an address hidden in the book and they hope that it will lead them to the book's true author. When Walter confronts the man, Dr. Sirius Leary, he commits suicide by cutting his own throat. Before dying, Leary tells Agatha to go to a now-abandoned mental institution that he used to work at. At the institute, Agatha discovers a box with Walter's name on it. Walter discovers a code in the book that tells the reader the location of Laura's body. Walter and Robin find the skeleton, but when they return with the police, the skeleton is missing. After seeing Agatha washing mud off her hands, she admits that she moved the skeleton. Walter accuses her of being Topsy Kretts. However, Agatha says that Walter was really the one who wrote the book.

Agatha shows Walter the box from the institute that has his name on it. Inside, Walter sees the sources he used to write the book, and begins having flashes of repressed memories. In room 23 of the hotel in the book, Walter finds the missing final chapter of the book scribbled under the wallpaper. Walter used to be obsessed with the 23 enigma because it drove his father to suicide. He was also involved with Laura, who left him for Flinch, resulting in him killing her. After Flinch was sent to prison for the murder, Walter wrote the book in the room as an elaborate suicide note, changing the details of his confession into a deranged fantasy. Walter then jumped off the balcony, but survived. The resulting brain damage left him with amnesia, and he was sent to the institute to recover, and met Agatha after being released. Dr. Leary, one of Walter's doctors, read the book and became obsessed with the number, eventually publishing the book under the name Topsy Kretts.

Agatha arrives, and tells Walter that he has changed, which is why she hid the skeleton. Convinced that he will kill again, Walter attempts to commit suicide by running into the path of a bus. However, Walter does not go through with it, not wanting Robin to lose a father like he did, and exclaims that 23 is just a number. Walter turns himself in to the police for the murder of Laura. While he awaits sentencing, his lawyer says that the judge will go easy on him because he confessed. Walter declares that this is not the happiest ending, but it is the right one, and expresses hope that things will return to normal for his family once he is released from prison. Laura's body is laid to rest in the cemetery, and Flinch is present, having been released from prison and now at peace.

The credits begin with a Bible verse (Numbers 32:23), which reads: "Be sure that your sin will find you out."

== Cast ==
- Jim Carrey as Walter Sparrow / Det. Fingerling
  - Paul Butcher as young Walter Sparrow / Det. Fingerling
- Virginia Madsen as Agatha Pink-Sparrow / Fabrizia
- Logan Lerman as Robin Sparrow
- Danny Huston as Isaac French / Dr. Miles Phoenix
- Rhona Mitra as Laura Tollins
- Bud Cort (uncredited) as Dr. Sirius Leary
- Chris Lajoie as Benton
- Mark Pellegrino as Kyle Flinch
- Lynn Collins as Suicide Blonde / Mrs. Dobkins / Fingerling's Mother
- Michelle Arthur as Sybil
- Ed Lauter as Father Sebastian
- Corey Stoll as Sgt. Burns
- Patricia Belcher as Dr. Alice Mortimer
- Troy Kotsur as Barnaby

== Production ==
Alissa Ferguson, an associate producer working for producer Beau Flynn, first read Fernley Phillips' screenplay for The Number 23 in 2002 and described it as "probably the best script I'd ever seen in my life." Until the screenplay was picked up, Phillips was destitute and planning to return home to England. The film spent enough time in development purgatory that Phillips and Ferguson developed a romantic relationship and married in January 2005, more than two years before the film's release.

Joel Schumacher signed on later that year to direct the film. He was scheduled to work on an ultimately unrealized remake of the Swedish film Sleepwalker before beginning production on The Number 23. Schumacher said he was unaware of the 23 enigma until he read the script and was described in the Los Angeles Times as a "numerology agnostic." Nonetheless, he hid the number throughout the movie for "23-ophiles" and the "avid fans" who he anticipated watching the DVD "over and over again."

Jim Carrey told reporters he was so captivated by the 23 enigma even before reading the script that he renamed his production company from "Pit Bull Productions" to "JC23." According to Carrey, he was reading a book about Psalm 23 when he was first given a copy of the screenplay to review. He said he asked a friend to read the script and "an hour and a half later he was on page 23, circling every 23rd word. That's the kind of thing I want to do to an audience." When he discovered that the first page of the script involved the lead character trying to capture a pit bull, he was "freaked out," given the change in name of his production company. Carrey had previously been attached to voice the Bowler Hat Guy in the 2007 Disney animated film Meet the Robinsons; however, he turned the role down and left the project to work on this film.

Filming was scheduled to begin in November 2005. Elisabeth Shue was initially signed on and scheduled to begin filming the part of Agatha but it was reported in January 2006 that she dropped out when she became pregnant. The following month, it was reported that Virginia Madsen was in negotiations to play the role.

During production, cast and crew members became fixated on the 23 enigma and began noticing the number in their daily lives. Among other coincidences, Virginia Madsen observed that the parking space assigned to her during shooting was numbered 23 and she and co-star Danny Huston had been married 23 years earlier. Schumacher had to redirect crew members who were distracted by filming the 23rd take of the 23rd scene on February 23, 2006. Carrey drew parallels between O. J. Simpson wearing the uniform number 32 and the murders of Nicole Simpson and Ronald Goldman, whose names had 23 letters between them.

Carrey's behavior during filming was reportedly bizarre and upsetting to others on set. Radar cited a source which told them that, during filming, Carrey "unzipped his fly and urinated as part of his improvisation. Everyone was horrified."

Logan Lerman later gave Carrey credit for taking the time to talk to him about acting. Lerman, who was only 15 at the time of the film's release, said he "learned a lot from how [Carrey] prepared for roles" and that "being able to see how he does it, being able to talk to him, really helped me a lot" as an actor.

== Reception ==
The Number 23 has an approval rating of 7% on Rotten Tomatoes based on 189 reviews; the average rating is 3.7/10. The site's consensus reads: "Jim Carrey has been sharp in a number of non-comedic roles, but this lurid, overheated, and self serious potboiler is not one of them. The Number 23 is clumsy, unengaging, and mostly confusing." Audiences surveyed by CinemaScore gave the film a grade of "B−" on scale of F to A+.

Of the few critics who liked the film, Richard Roeper and critic George Pennachio of KABC-TV in Los Angeles stand out, as they gave the film a "two thumbs up" rating on the television show Ebert & Roeper (Pennachio was standing in for Roger Ebert due to Ebert's illness). However, Michael Phillips, filling in for Ebert on the Worst of 2007 show put The Number 23 at No. 7 in his list of the worst (Roeper did not include it in his list).

Peter Travers of Rolling Stone declared the film the year's worst star vehicle on his list of the Worst Movies of 2007, while Colm Andrew of the Manx Independent said the film "delivers a rambling, confusing narrative with only a few stylistic elements thrown in". The film was nominated for two Teen Choice Awards. For his performance, Carrey was nominated for the Golden Raspberry Award for Worst Actor at the 28th Golden Raspberry Awards, but lost to Eddie Murphy for Norbit.

=== Box office ===
On its opening weekend, The Number 23 took in $14,602,867, coming in behind Ghost Rider's second weekend. After five weeks of release, the film grossed $35,193,167 at the domestic box office and $42,373,648 overseas, for a worldwide total of $77,566,815. The film was released in the United Kingdom on February 23, 2007, and opened on #3, behind Charlotte's Web and Hot Fuzz.

== Home media ==
The film was released on DVD on July 24, 2007 and on Blu-ray on October 6, 2009. The DVD release was the final release to feature New Line Home Entertainment's Infinifilm label.

== See also ==
- 32aam Adhyayam 23aam Vaakyam
- 23 (film)
