= VFP-62 =

Light Photographic Squadron 62
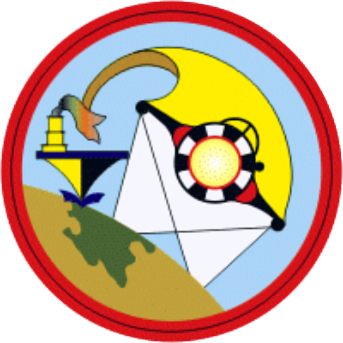
- VFP-62 Insignia
- Active: January 1949 - 1 January 1968
- Country: United States
- Branch: United States Navy
- Role: Aerial reconnaissance
- Part of: Inactive
- Nickname(s): Fighting Photos
- Engagements: Korean War; Cuban Missile Crisis; Vietnam War

Aircraft flown
- Reconnaissance: F8F-2P Bearcat; F4U-5P Corsair; F2H-2P Banshee; F9F-6P/-8P Cougar; RF-8A/G Crusader

Light Photographic Squadron 62 (VFP-62) was an aviation unit of the United States Navy in service from 1949 to 1968. The squadron provided a detachment of reconnaissance planes for each of the carrier air wings of the U.S. Atlantic Fleet.

== History ==
VFP-62 was established in January 1949 as Composite Squadron SIX TWO (VC-62), nicknamed the Fighting Photos, and was equipped with Grumman F8F-2P Bearcat and Vought F4U-5P Corsair fighter aircraft converted to reconnaissance platforms. The first VC-62 detachment was assigned to Carrier Air Group 7 (CVG-7) aboard the aircraft carrier USS Leyte from September 1949 to January 1950 for a deployment to the Mediterranean Sea.

Detachments of the squadron operated from all Atlantic Fleet attack aircraft carriers based on the U.S. east coast. From September 1950 to February 1951, a VC-62 detachment also operated during the Korean War from the USS Leyte as part of CVG-3.

In 1951, the squadron converted to jet aircraft and was equipped with the McDonnell F2H-2P Banshee. On 2 July 1956, the squadron was redesignated Photographic Reconnaissance Squadron SIX TWO (VFP-62) and transitioned to the Grumman F9F-6P Cougar (later F9F-8P).

Renamed Light Photographic Squadron SIX TWO (VFP-62) in order to distinguish it from Heavy Photographic squadrons that were being established, the squadron received its first Vought F8U-1P Crusader aircraft in 1959, which were redesignated as the RF-8A in 1962. In 1966, these aircraft were upgraded to a new standard designated as the RF-8G.

VFP-62 is best known as the squadron that took the first low-level photos of the Soviet missile bases in Cuba during the Cuban Missile Crisis in October 1962. At the time, it was commanded by then-Commander William Ecker, USN. In 2000, the movie Thirteen Days (film), produced by Kevin Costner, showed the actions of Ecker and the other members of VFP-62 during the Cuban Missile Crisis.

From June 1966 to February 1967, VFP-62 Det 42 operated from the USS Franklin D. Roosevelt off Vietnam as part of CVW-1. VFP-62 was subsequently disestablished on 1 January 1968, with its role assumed by its Pacific Fleet sister squadron, VFP-63, also flying the RF-8G, and by several reconnaissance attack squadrons (RVAH) flying the North American RA-5C Vigilante.

== Gallery ==
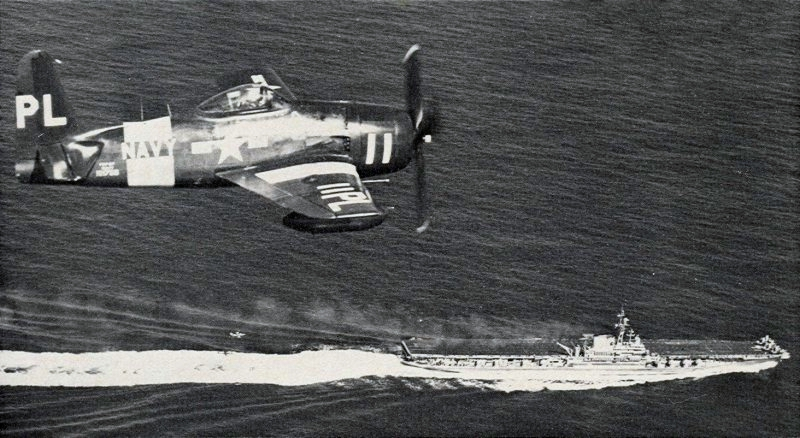
An F8F-2P over USS Midway 1949/50

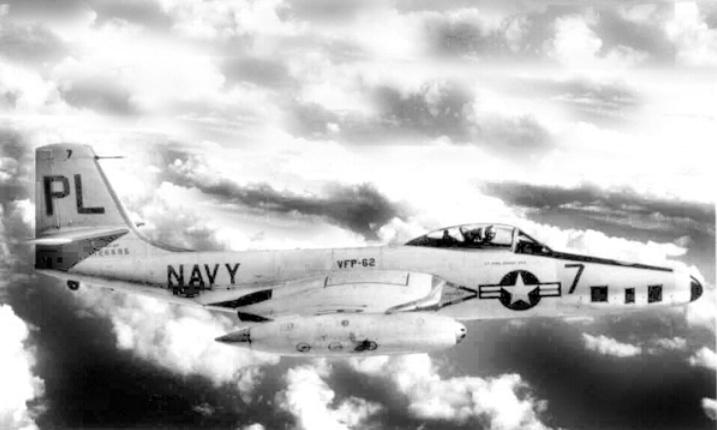
An F2H-2P in 1956

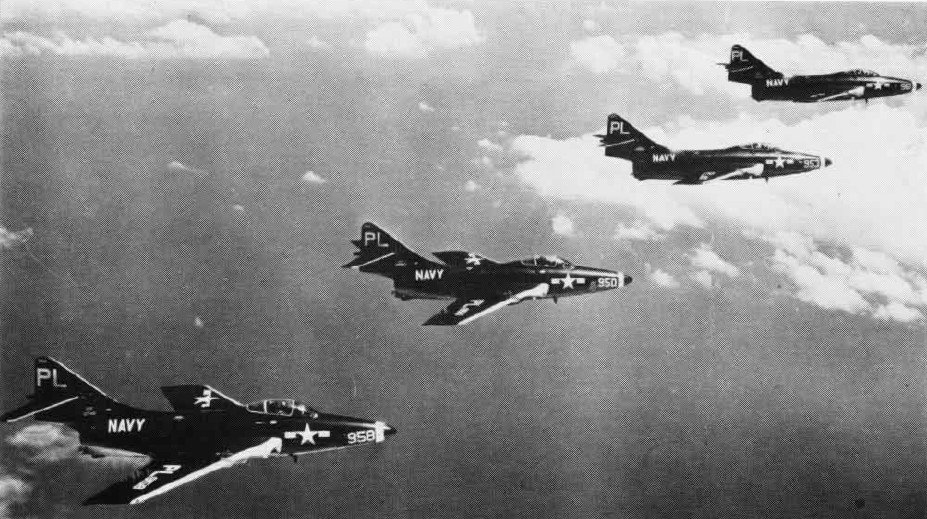
F9F-6Ps in 1956

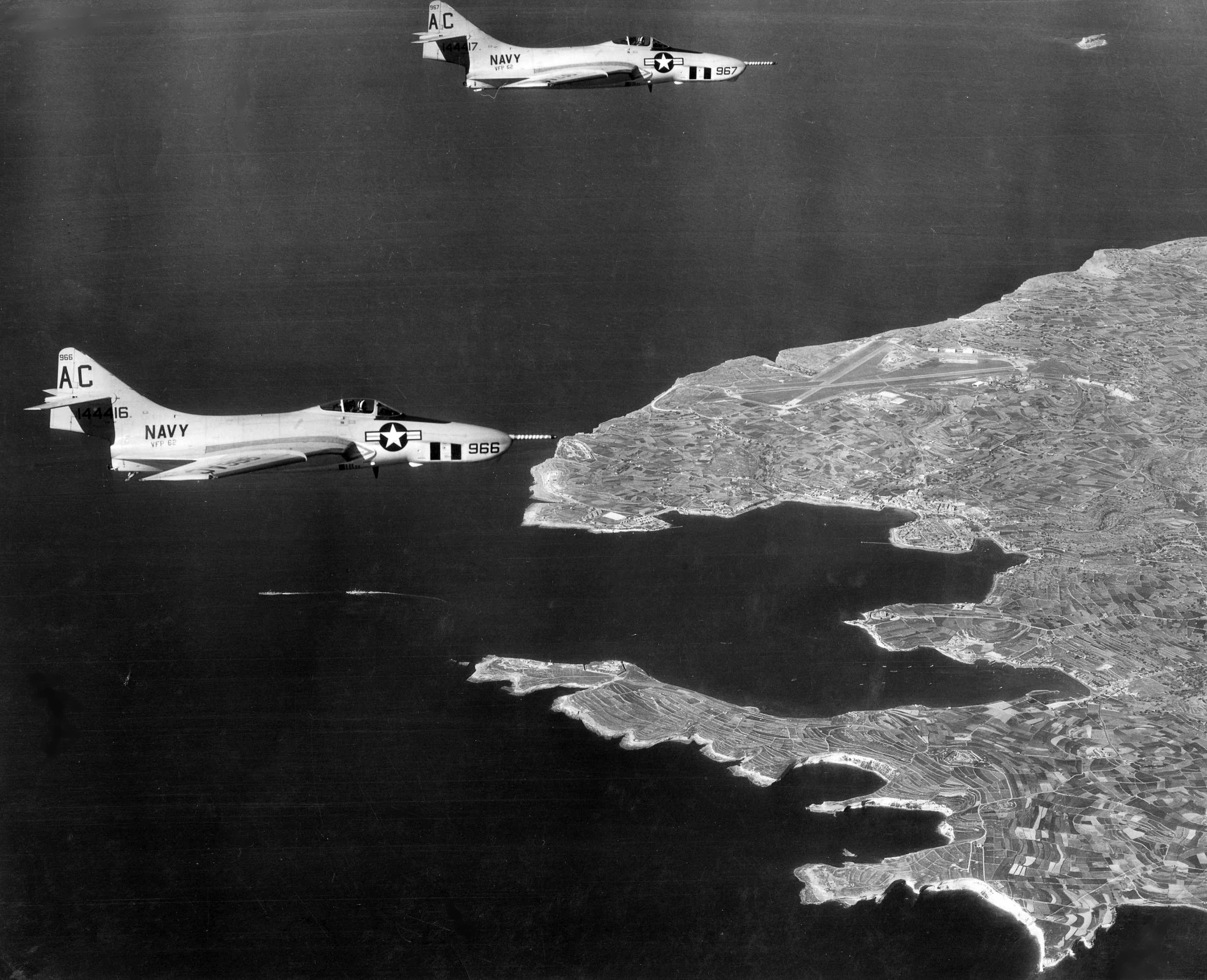
F9F-8Ps over Malta, 1958

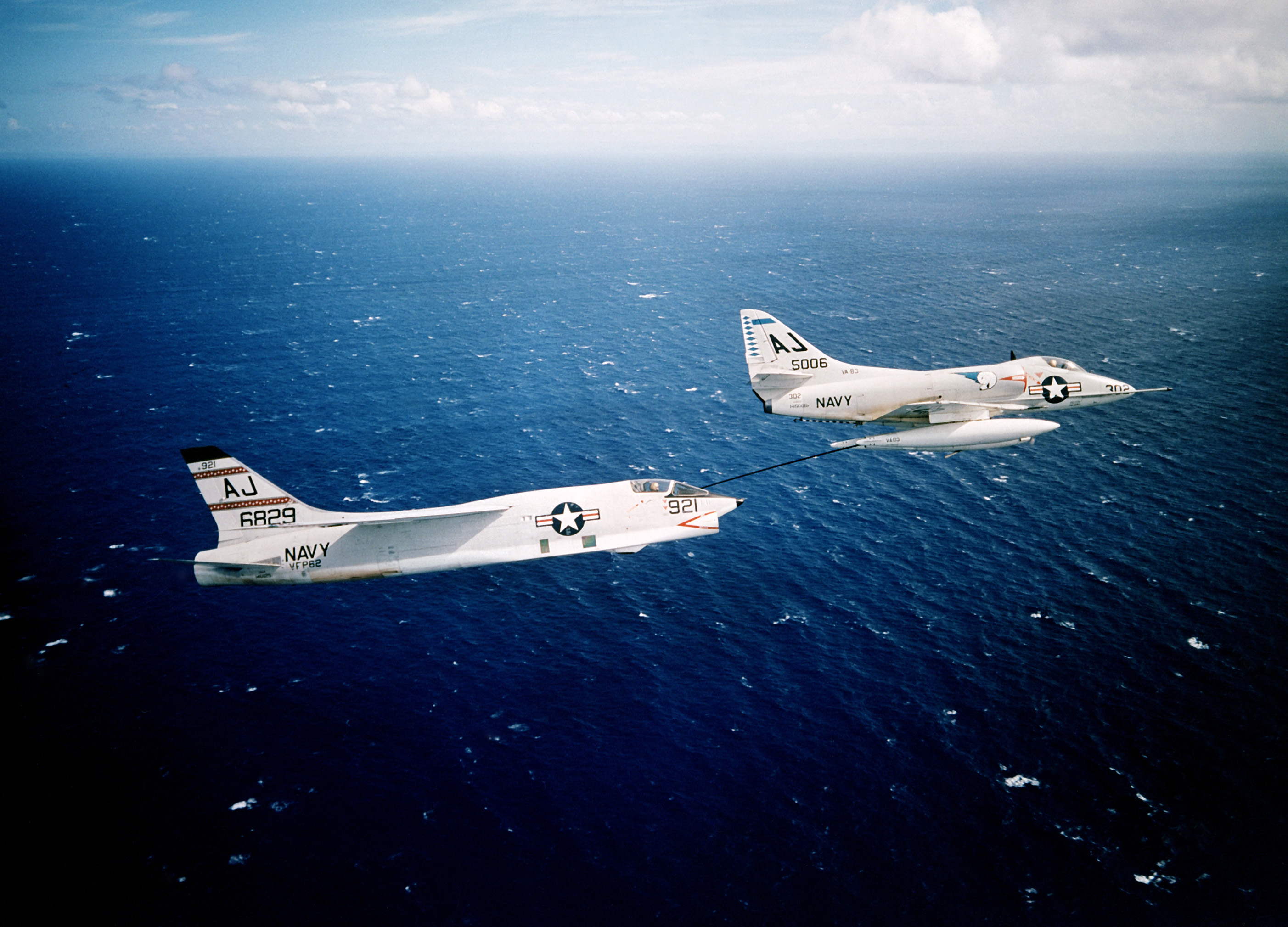
An A4D-2 refuels an F8U-1P in 1960

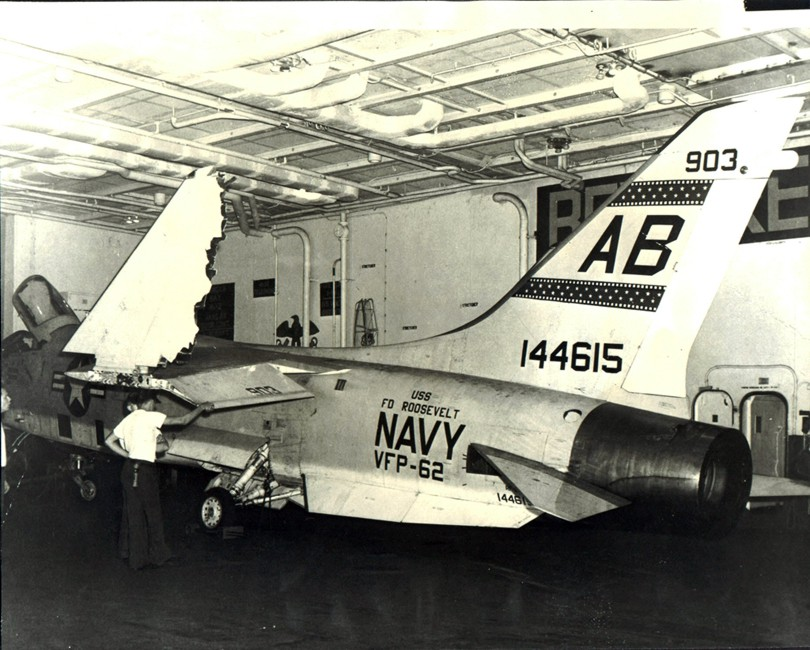
A VFP-62 RF-8G damaged by flak over Vietnam, 1967

== Unit awards ==
On 26 November 1962, VFP-62 was awarded the first peacetime Navy Unit Commendation, personally by President John F. Kennedy for the squadron's actions during the Cuban Missile Crisis.
