= Aleksandr Feklisov =

Soviet spy and NKVD Case Officer (1914–2007)

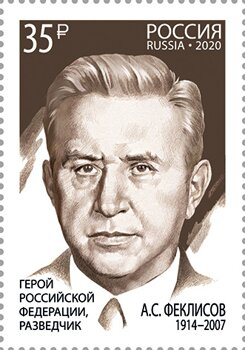
- Feklisov on a 2020 Russian stamp
- Born: 9 March 1914; Moscow, Russian Empire
- Died: 26 October 2007 (aged 93); Moscow, Russia
- Occupation: Spy
- Awards: Hero of the Russian Federation

Aleksandr Semyonovich Feklisov (Russian: Александр Семёнович Феклисов; 9 March 1914 – 26 October 2007) was a Soviet spy, a NKVD Case Officer.

== Life and work ==
Feklisov was born in a family of railway workers. In 1939 he graduated from the Radio Faculty of the Moscow Institute of Communications, and shortly after that was sent to a training school of the Main Directorate of State Security, where he specialized in the United States.

From 1941 to 1946 Feklisov worked out of the Soviet consulate office in New York City, (Note: Feklisov's code name was KALISTRAT (CALISTRATUS).) first as a radio operator and then as a field officer. His supervisor was Senior NKVD Case officer Anatoli Yatskov (alias Yakovlev). Part of Feklisov's duties included recruiting espionage agent prospects from those sympathetic to the Communist Party of the United States and its auxiliary secret apparatus.

Julius Rosenberg was among these recruits. In the period from 1943 to 1946, Feklisov reported at least 50 meetings with Rosenberg. He stated that Rosenberg provided important top secret information about electronics and helped organize an industrial espionage ring for Moscow, but "didn't understand anything about the atom bomb." Feklisov stated that Ethel Rosenberg, as a "probationer", did not meet directly with her Soviet agent handler. He also said she "had nothing to do with this" and was "completely innocent." Feklisov once wrote that Julius Rosenberg was the only agent that he viewed as a close friend. He, in response, told Feklisov that their meetings were “among the happiest moments of my life.” Feklisov was also the Case Officer for Joel Barr and Alfred Sarant, two other members of the Soviet Atomic Spy Ring. In April 1950 Feklisov returned to the USSR.

Feklisov was transferred back to the United States and became the Washington, D.C. Rezident, or KGB Station Chief, from 1960 to 1964. His cover name at that time was Aleksandr Fomin. As PGU KGB Rezident, Feklisov (Fomin) proposed what became the basis for resolving the Cuban Missile Crisis: removing missiles from Cuba in exchange for a promise that the United States would not invade the island nation.

Feklisov died on 26 October 2007 in Moscow at the age of 93.

== Legacy ==
Feklisov was portrayed by Harris Yulin in the 1974 film The Missiles of October, and by Boris Krutonog in the 2000 film Thirteen Days.

Feklisov, A. S. Beyond the Ocean and on the Island: Notes of an Intelligence Officer. — Moscow: DEM, 1994. — 277 p. — (On Intelligence and Espionage Firsthand). — 40,000 copies. — ISBN 5-85207-055-6.

Feklisov, A. S. Confession of an Intelligence Officer. — Moscow: OLMA-PRESS; LG Information Group, 1999. — 477 p. — (Mission). — 11,000 copies. — ISBN 5-224-00631-7.

Feklisov, A. S. Kennedy and Soviet Intelligence Agents. — Moscow: Eksmo; Algorithm, 2011. — 304 p. — ISBN 978-5-699-46002-1.

Feklisov, A. S. “The Feat of Klaus Fuchs.” // Military-Historical Journal. — 1990. — No. 12. — pp. 22–29; 1991. — No. 1. — pp. 34–43.

Feklisov, Aleksandr. The Man Behind the Rosenbergs: Memoirs of the KGB Spymaster Who Also Controlled Klaus Fuchs and Helped Resolve the Cuban Missile Crisis. — New York: Enigma Books, 2001. — ISBN 1-929631-08-1.

== See also ==
- List of Heroes of the Russian Federation
