= The Missiles of October =

1974 American made-for-television play

- DVD cover for the film
- Genre: Docudrama
- Written by: Stanley R. Greenberg
- Directed by: Anthony Page
- Starring: William Devane; Martin Sheen; Howard da Silva; Ralph Bellamy
- Theme music composer: Laurence Rosenthal
- Country of origin: United States
- Original language: English

Production
- Executive producer: Irv Wilson
- Producers: Robert Berger; Herbert Brodkin
- Editor: Jerry Greene
- Running time: 150 mins
- Production companies: Maljack Productions; Viacom Productions

Original release
- Network: ABC
- Release: December 18, 1974

The Missiles of October is a 1974 television docudrama about the Cuban Missile Crisis in October 1962. The title evokes the 1962 book The Guns of August by Barbara Tuchman, about the missteps amongst the great powers and the failed chances to give an opponent a graceful way out, which led to World War I.

The Missiles of October introduced William Devane as President John F. Kennedy and cast Martin Sheen as Attorney General Robert F. Kennedy. The teleplay was originally broadcast by ABC-TV on Wednesday, December 18, 1974. The script was based on Robert Kennedy's posthumously-published 1969 book Thirteen Days: A Memoir of the Cuban Missile Crisis.

== Plot ==
In October 1962, United States U-2 flights reveal the Soviet Union is placing ballistic missiles in Cuba, only 90 miles from the continental United States. President John F. Kennedy collects a group of advisors from his cabinet and the military to assess the situation and develop a strategy to negotiate the withdrawal of the missiles. Tensions run high as Soviet premier Nikita Khrushchev refuses to cease operations. Kennedy goes public with the information and announces the U.S. will establish a Naval blockade of Cuba. Khrushchev responds that Soviet ships will breach the blockade. An American U-2 pilot is killed over Cuba during a reconnaissance mission. The United States and the Soviet Union appear to be on the brink of nuclear war; ultimately, the crisis is resolved and war avoided when the Soviets agree to withdraw its missiles conditioned upon the U.S. promising never to invade Cuba.

== Cast ==
- William Devane as John F. Kennedy, President of the United States
- Martin Sheen as Robert F. Kennedy, Attorney General of the United States
- Howard da Silva as Nikita Khrushchev, Premier of the Soviet Union
- Ralph Bellamy as Adlai Stevenson, US Ambassador to the United Nations
- Michael Lerner as Pierre Salinger, White House Press Secretary
- Clifford David as Theodore Sorensen, White House Counsel
- John Dehner as Dean Acheson, former US Secretary of State
- Nehemiah Persoff as Andrei Gromyko, Soviet Foreign Minister
- Albert Paulsen as Anatoly Dobrynin, Soviet Ambassador to the United States
- Will Kuluva as Valerian Zorin, Soviet Diplomat
- Dana Elcar as Robert McNamara, United States Secretary of Defense
- Larry Gates as Dean Rusk, United States Secretary of State
- William Prince as C. Douglas Dillon, US Secretary of the Treasury
- Keene Curtis as John McCone, Director of the CIA
- James Olson as McGeorge Bundy, US National Security Advisor
- Andrew Duggan as General Maxwell Taylor, Chairman of the Joint Chiefs of Staff
- Robert P. Lieb as Curtis LeMay, Chief of Staff of the US Air Force
- Richard Eastham as David M. Shoup, Commandant of the Marine Corps
- Dennis Patrick as Llewellyn Thompson, Former US Ambassador to the Soviet Union
- Kenneth Tobey as Admiral George W. Anderson Jr., Chief of Naval Operations
- James Hong as U Thant, UN Secretary General
- John Randolph as George Ball, Undersecretary of State
- Wright King as Richard Russell Jr., Senator
- Byron Morrow as J. William Fulbright, Senator
- Francis De Sales as unnamed Republican Senator
- Arthur Franz as Charles A. Halleck, Congressman
- Ron Feinberg as Charles de Gaulle, French President
- Paul Lambert as John A. Scali, ABC News Correspondent
- Doreen Lang as Evelyn Lincoln, President Kennedy's personal secretary
- Harris Yulin as Alexander Fomin, KGB spy
- Stewart Moss as Kenneth O'Donnell, Special Assistant to the President
- James T. Callahan as David Powers, Special Assistant to the President
- Peter Donat as David Ormsby-Gore, British Ambassador to the United States
- Ted Hartley as unnamed Air Force Major General
- Stacy Keach Sr. as William E. Knox, President of Westinghouse Electric International
- John McMurtry as Russian poet Yevgeny Yevtushenko
- Peter Canon as Admiral's Aide
- Charles Cyphers as Press Photographer
- Eugene Elman as Russian Presidium Member (as Gene Elman)
- Michael Fox as Soviet Marshal
- Jerome Guardino as Reporter
- Bern Hoffman as Russian Presidium Member
- Richard Karlan as Chief of the Presidium
- Stuart Nisbet as Reporter
- Buddy Ochoa as Television Assistant
- Toby Russ as Waiter
- Serge Tschernisch as Soviet Stenographer
- Jay Varela as Cuban Delegate (as Jay Vallera)
- George Wyner as Civilian Aide
- Thayer David as uncredited narrator

== Production notes ==
The title of the play was influenced by the 1962 book The Guns of August by Barbara W. Tuchman, which describes various events leading to World War I and had been read by US President John F. Kennedy shortly before the crisis. In the play, Kennedy compares events in the book to the crisis with the Soviet Union.

Staged as a two-and-a-half hour television play, the production eschews physical action and detailed sets and wardrobes in favor of emphasis on dialogue, emotion, and decision-making. The plot depicts how the world came close to the brink of but eventually stepped away from global thermonuclear war and highlights the roles of President Kennedy, US Attorney General Robert F. Kennedy, Soviet Premier Nikita Khrushchev, US Ambassador to the United Nations Adlai Stevenson, and former US Secretary of State Dean Acheson during the crisis.

The Missiles of October gave the American general public its first look behind the scenes at the inner workings, disagreements, and ultimate consensus of the Kennedy administration to blockade Cuba, rather than invade to dislodge the just-discovered partially completed Soviet nuclear missile emplacements in Cuba. It details US attempts to give the Soviets room to negotiate without appearing to capitulate and periodically depicts Khrushchev reporting progress of the events to his Communist Party cohorts.

Vice-President Lyndon B. Johnson, who was a member of EXCOMM and was present at most meetings during the crisis, does not appear in the docudrama.

The play was directed by Anthony Page with writing credits given to Stanley R. Greenberg and Robert Kennedy. The play is noted for Sheen's changing accent throughout the play as well as his several flubbed lines in the first several acts.

== Awards ==
Technical Director Ernie Buttelman won the 1975 Emmy Award for outstanding achievement. There were several other Emmy nominations, including outstanding drama or comedy special, outstanding supporting actor in a comedy or drama special for Ralph Bellamy, and outstanding writing in an original teleplay for Greenberg. The same year Greenberg won the Humanitas Prize in the 90-minute category.

In 1997, the play won a Producers Guild of America Hall of Fame award.

== See also ==
- Thirteen Days (book), memoirs of the crisis by Robert Kennedy
- Thirteen Days (film), a 2000 retelling of the story with newly declassified information not available in 1974
- Cultural depictions of John F. Kennedy
- Robert F. Kennedy in media
