= Christopher Lawford =

American author, actor, and activist (1955–2018)

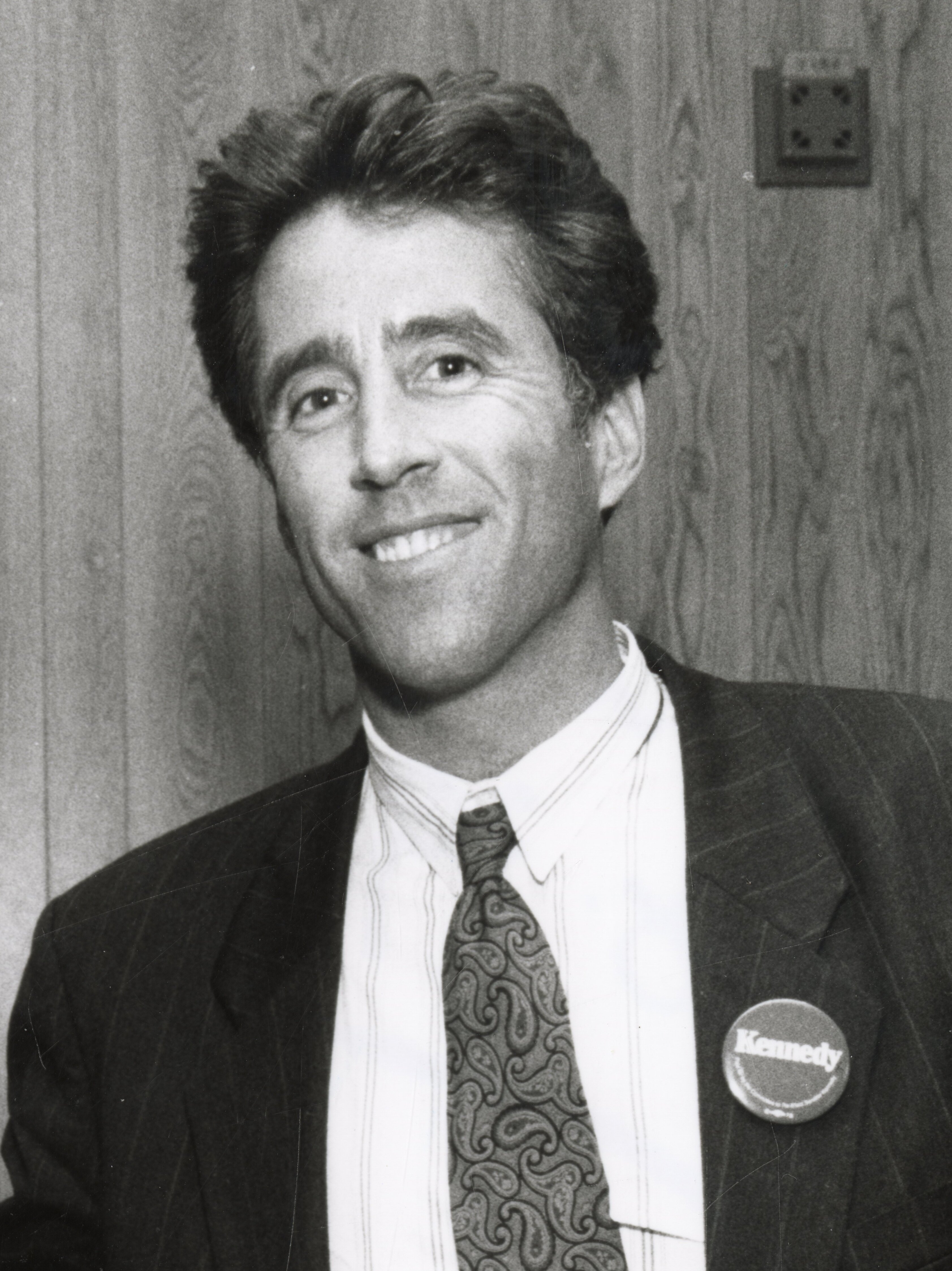
- Lawford in 1994
- Born: Christopher Kennedy Lawford; March 29, 1955; Santa Monica, California, U.S.
- Died: September 4, 2018 (aged 63); Vancouver, British Columbia, Canada
- Education: Tufts University (BA); Boston College (JD); Harvard University
- Occupations: Author; actor; activist
- Years active: 1988–2008
- Spouses: Jeannie Olsson (m. 1984; div. 2000) Lana Antonova (m. 2005; div. 2009) Mercedes Miller (m. 2014; div. 2016)
- Children: 3
- Parent(s): Peter Lawford; Patricia Kennedy Lawford
- Relatives: See Kennedy family

Signature
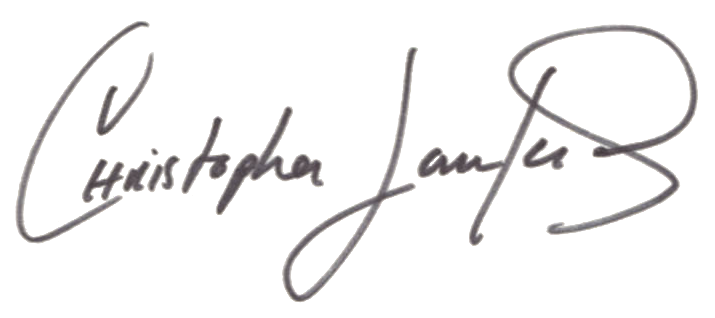

Christopher Kennedy Lawford (March 29, 1955 – September 4, 2018) was an American author, actor, and activist. He was a member of the prominent Kennedy family, and son of English actor Peter Lawford and Patricia "Pat" Kennedy Lawford, who was a sister of President John F. Kennedy. He graduated from Tufts University in 1977 and earned a Juris Doctor degree from Boston College in 1983. He later earned a master's certificate in Clinical Psychology from Harvard University and was a lecturer on drug addiction.

After struggling with addiction for 17 years, he became an actor, performing in several movies and television shows for over 20 years. He wrote several books, based on his own experience, about addiction and recovery. He also traveled around the U.S. speaking about his experiences with addiction for 20 years, and was a public health campaigner, working with organizations like the World Health Organization (WHO) and the United Nations (UN), and for the U.S. federal government.

== Early life and education ==
Lawford was born on March 29, 1955, in Santa Monica, California. He was named for Saint Christopher and because his mother liked the name. He was the eldest child and only son of actor and "Rat Pack" member Peter Lawford (1923–1984) and Patricia "Pat" Kennedy Lawford (1924–2006), who was President John F. Kennedy's sister. His three younger sisters were Sydney Lawford McKelvy (born 1956), Victoria Pender (born 1958), and Robin Lawford (born 1961). Lawford described himself as a "second-string Kennedy", because he did not get as much attention as his cousins. His parents divorced in 1966; Patricia Lawford moved from California to New York City with her son and daughters.

Before his parents' divorce, Lawford attended St. Martin of Tours Elementary School in Los Angeles, where at the age of 8, he was informed about his uncle John F. Kennedy's assassination. After moving to New York City with his mother, he attended the Middlesex School, a prep school in Concord, Massachusetts. He graduated from Tufts University in 1977 and earned a J.D. degree from Boston College Law School in 1983. He failed the Massachusetts bar exam. He later earned a master's certificate in Clinical Psychology from Harvard University, and lectured on drug addiction at Harvard, Columbia University, and other colleges.

=== Drug and legal issues ===
In 1969, the year after his uncle Robert F. Kennedy was assassinated, when Lawford was 14, he was introduced to LSD by his peers at school. He was addicted to alcohol, cocaine, uppers, downers, and "any other drugs he could buy" for the next 17 years. During that time, he was "in and out of hospitals and arrested three times", including in 1980, for impersonating a doctor in Aspen, Colorado in order to purchase prescription medication. The charges were later dropped when Lawford completed his probation. In 2000, Lawford was diagnosed with hepatitis C, which he contracted due to his years of drug use.

Lawford briefly attended Fordham Law School, but dropped out after a few months due to his dependency on heroin. In April 1984, the same year his father Peter Lawford died at the age of 61, after years of alcohol and drug abuse, Lawford's cousin and best friend David Kennedy, and third oldest son of Robert Kennedy, who also battled substance abuse issues, died of a drug overdose at the age of 28. David's death prompted Lawford to seek professional help for his issues. In 1986, at the age of 30, Lawford entered rehab and got treatment for his drug addiction. Lawford remained clean and sober until his death in 2018.

== Career ==
=== Acting ===
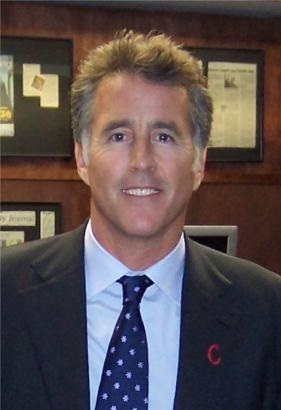
Lawford in 2008

Lawford chose to become an actor (as his father had been) in the mid-1980s, after realizing that a law career would not suit him. He performed in commercials in Boston for two years, and then he and his wife moved to Southern California in 1988 so that he could pursue an acting career. He worked in film and television for over 20 years. His acting credits included the sitcom Frasier and the drama The O.C.. In 2003, he had a brief stint on the soap opera General Hospital, but was best known for playing Philip "Charlie" Brent Jr. on All My Children from 1992 to 1995.

Lawford had small roles in films such as The Russia House, a 1990 spy thriller co-starring Michelle Pfeiffer and Sean Connery, and the 1991 rock-music film The Doors, which was directed by Oliver Stone. Lawford played Navy officer William Ecker in the 2000 film Thirteen Days, a drama about the 1962 Cuban Missile Crisis. In 1997, Lawford had a role in the independent comedy Kiss Me Guido as the gay lover of the main character. He also had a small role in Terminator 3: Rise of the Machines, co-starring Arnold Schwarzenegger, who directed Lawford in a 1990 episode of the HBO anthology series Tales from the Crypt ("The Switch") and was married to Lawford's cousin Maria Shriver at the time. In 2005, Lawford appeared in the motorcycle racing film The World's Fastest Indian, co-starring Anthony Hopkins.

=== Writing ===
Lawford wrote several books "that described his efforts to recover from drug addiction". In 2005, he published his memoir, Symptoms of Withdrawal, in which he recounted decades of "better living through chemistry". In 2009, he wrote Moments of Clarity, a compilation of first-person recollections by famous addicts, including Ed Begley Jr., Alec Baldwin, Buzz Aldrin, Richard Dreyfuss, Martin Sheen, Judy Collins, and musician and federal prisoner Dejuan Verrett. The book was dedicated to Lawford's cousin David Kennedy, and another cousin, Patrick J. Kennedy, wrote the introduction. Lawford told interviewer Connie Martinson that although writing Moments of Clarity was "difficult" and he did not want to do it, the book was "meant to happen".

In 2013, Lawford published Recover to Live: Kick Any Habit, Manage Any Addiction, in which he interviewed 100 addiction specialists and described treatments for alcohol and drug dependence, gambling, sex and porn, eating disorders, smoking, and hoarding. In 2014, he published What Addicts Know: 10 Lessons From Recovery To Benefit Everyone; Dr. Drew Pinsky wrote the foreword. Lawford's final book about addiction and recovery was 2016's When Your Partner Has an Addiction, "a how-to manual for people who want to stay with their addicted partners", which he co-authored with psychotherapist Beverly Engel.

Lawford also wrote a book about dealing with hepatitis C, called Healing Hepatitis C, which he co-wrote with Diana Sylvestre in 2009.

=== Activism ===
Lawford traveled around the U.S. speaking about his experiences with addiction for 20 years. He was a public health campaigner, and worked with the World Health Organization (WHO), the White House Office of National Drug Control Policy, and the Canadian Centre on Substance Abuse, and was a public advocacy consultant to Caron Treatment Centers, an organization that ran treatment programs. In 2001, Lawford founded and was CEO of the Global Recovery Initiative, a not-for-profit organization that "seeks to remove barriers and provide opportunities for people in recovery".

Lawford also worked with the United Nations (UN). In March 2010, he traveled to Ukraine on behalf of the UN, to participate in a discussion with health officials and advocates about "issues related to hepatitis C (Hep C) prevention in Ukraine", and to raise awareness. In 2011, he was named a Goodwill Ambassador on Drug Dependence Treatment and Care, in 2012, was involved in a campaign against opiate use in Afghanistan, and served on the UN's Office on Drugs and Crime. His cousin, former Rhode Island congressman Patrick J. Kennedy, said about Lawford: "Chris was one of those people who had a way of telling stories that lifted people's perceptions and judgments of those who suffer from the disease of addiction".

== Personal life ==
Lawford married and divorced three times. From 1984 to 2001, he was married to Jeannie Olsson, an ad-sales assistant for New York Magazine. They had three children, David Christopher Kennedy Lawford (named after his cousin David Kennedy), Savannah Rose Lawford, and Matthew Peter Valentine Lawford. In 2005, he married Russian actress Lana Antonova; they divorced in 2009. In 2014, Lawford married yoga instructor Mercedes Miller in Hawaii; they divorced in 2016. At the time of his death in 2018, he had been in a relationship with his girlfriend Kyla Resch since August 2017.

== Death ==
On September 4, 2018, after experiencing a medical emergency while at a yoga studio, Lawford died of a heart attack in Vancouver, British Columbia. At the time, he had been living with his girlfriend in Vancouver where he was working toward opening a recovery center. Patrick J. Kennedy told the Associated Press that Lawford had been doing "hot yoga, which he did often, but the strain of it 'must have been too much for him at that point'". Lawford's cousins Maria Shriver, Patrick J. Kennedy, and Kerry Kennedy took to Twitter after his death, honoring Lawford's work in addiction recovery.

== Filmography ==
=== Film ===
Year	Title	Role	Notes
1988	The Suicide Club	Boyfriend	
1988	Mr. North	Michael Patrick Ennis III	
1988	Spellbinder	Phil	
1990	Impulse	Steve	
1990	The Russia House	Larry	
1991	Run	Martins	
1991	The Doors	New York Journalist	
1993	Jack the Bear	Vince Buccini	
1994	Blankman	Mayor Marvin Harris	
1995	Drunks	Rich	
1997	Kiss Me, Guido	Dakota	TV movie, Executive Producer
1997	Fool's Paradise	Sen. Brill	
1998	Dead Broke	Joshua	
1998	Not Even the Trees	Robert	
1998	Dark Tides	—N/a	
1998	Ask for Becky Whiteworth	—N/a	
1999	The Confession	D.A. Elliott Cunningham	
1999	The Waiting Game	L.A. Director	Credited as Chris Lawford
1999	The Sex Monster	Dave Pembroke	
2000	R2PC: Road to Park City	Christoper Lawford	
2000	Chump Change	Studio Executive #1	
2000	The 6th Day	Police Lieutenant	
2000	Thirteen Days	Commander William Ecker	
2001	Fourplay	Davis	
2001	Red Zone		
2001	Exit Wounds	The Vice President	
2002	Hitters	Cassidey	
2003	Terminator 3: Rise of the Machines	Brewster's Aide	Credited as Chris Lawford
2005	The World's Fastest Indian	Jim Moffet	Credited as Chris Lawford
2007	Slipstream	Lars	
2008	Eavesdrop	Claude	(final film role)

=== Television ===
Year	Title	Role	Notes
1990	The Magical World of Disney	—N/a	Episode: "Exile"
1990	Tales from the Crypt	Manager	Episode: "The Switch"
1990	Midnight Caller	Richard Clark	2 episodes
1991	Silk Stalkings	Chick Westfall	Episode: "S.O.B"
1992–1996	All My Children	Charlie Brent	129 episodes
1996	The Abduction	Dan Solano	TV movie
1998	Witness to the Mob	Prosecutor John Gleeson	TV movie
1999	Chicago Hope	—N/a	Episode: "Upstairs, Downstairs"
1999	Mary, Mother of Jesus	Reuben	TV movie
2001	100 Centre Street	Rich	Episode: "Joe Must Go"
2001	Walking Shadow	Jimmy Christopholous	TV movie
2002	Counterstrike	Vice President Chet Ridgeway	TV movie
2003	General Hospital	Senator Jordan	3 episodes
2003	Frasier	Bill	Episode: "Daphne Does Dinner"
2005	The O.C.	Ross	Episode: "The Father Knows Best"

=== Bibliography ===
- Symptoms of Withdrawal: A Memoir of Snapshots and Redemption, 2005
- Healing Hepatitis C, 2009
- Moments of Clarity: Voices from the Front Lines of Addiction and Recovery, 2009
- Recover to Live: Kick Any Habit, Manage Any Addiction, 2013
- What Addicts Know: 10 Lessons from Recovery to Benefit Everyone, 2014

== See also ==
- Kennedy family
- Kennedy curse
