= Kryukovo District =

Kryukovo District район Крюково
- District
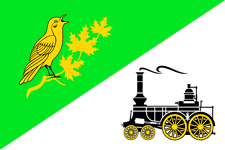
- Flag Coat of arms
- Location of Kryukovo District in Moscow
- Coordinates: 55°58′25″N 37°10′04″E
- Country: Russia
- Federal subject: Moscow

Population (2010 Census)
  - Total: 85,219
  - Urban: 100%
  - Rural: 0%
- Time zone: UTC+3 (MSK)
- OKTMO ID: 45330000
- Website: http://www.krukovo.org/

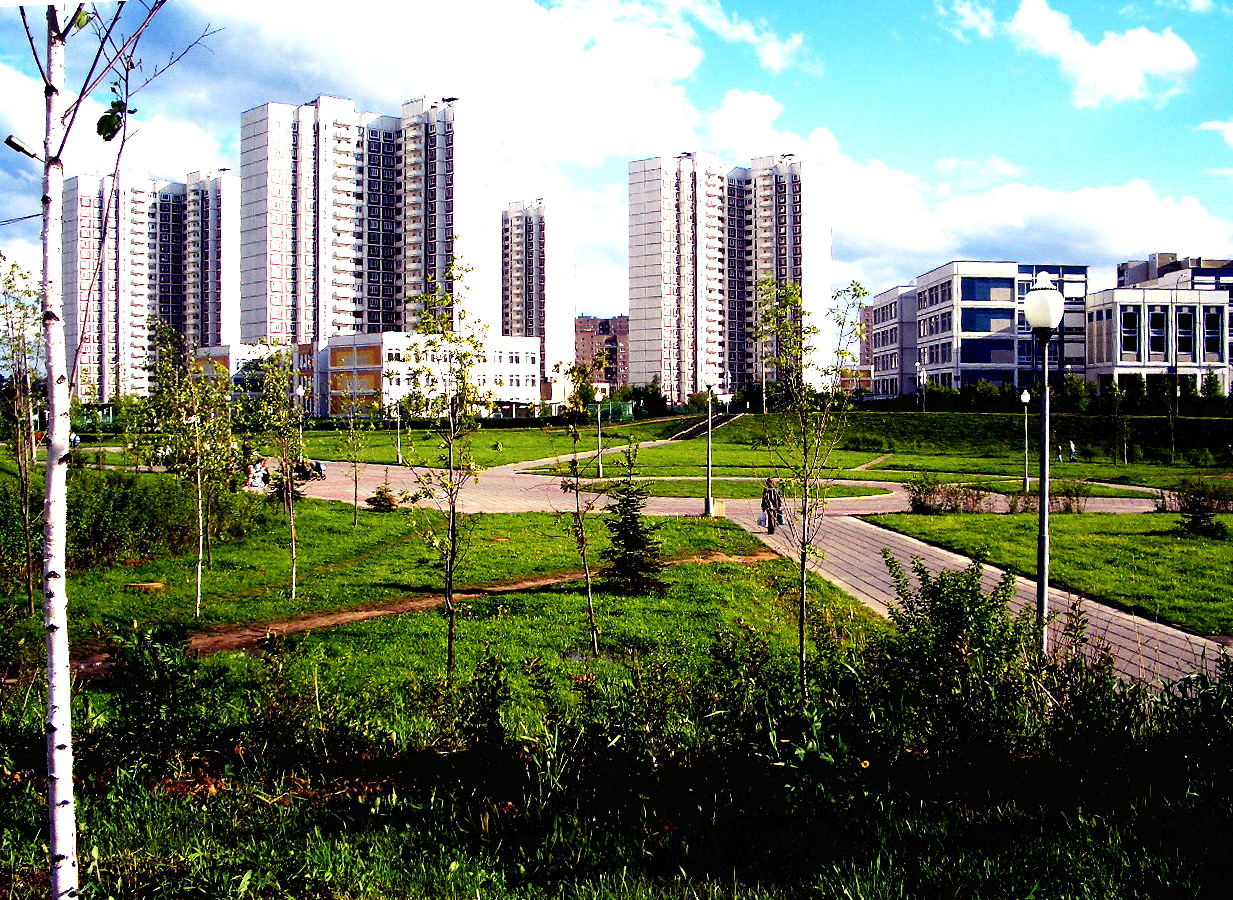
Modern Kryukovo District; 16th Microdistrict

Kryukovo (Russian: Крю́ково) is a district of Zelenogradsky Administrative Okrug in the federal city of Moscow, Russia. Population: 85,219 (2010 Census); 73,481 (2002 Census).

== History ==
It was formerly a village in Solnechnogorsky District of Moscow Oblast.

Kryukovo was where German forces came the closest to Moscow (41 km) during World War II. Now several monuments are located in Kryukovo and in the surrounding area.

== Transportation ==
The main railway station in Zelenograd is also called Kryukovo.
