= Alfred Sarant =

American engineer, Soviet spy (1918–1979)

- Born: Alfred Epaminondas Sarant; 26 September 1918; New York City, U.S.
- Died: 12 March 1979 (aged 60); Moscow, Russian SFSR, Soviet Union
- Burial place: Bolsheokhtinsky Cemetery in Leningrad
- Other names: Filipp Georgievich Staros; Philip Georgievich Staros
- Awards: Order of the Red Banner of Labour (1958); Doctor of Technical Sciences (1967); USSR State Prize (1969)
- Espionage activity
- Allegiance: United States (defected); Soviet Union
- Service years: 1941–1950
- Codename: Kh'YUS/HUGHES

Alfred Epaminondas Sarant, also known as Filipp Georgievich Staros and Philip Georgievich Staros (September 26, 1918 – March 12, 1979), was an engineer and a member of the Communist Party in New York City in 1944. He was part of the Rosenberg spy ring that reported to Soviet intelligence. Sarant worked on secret military radar at the United States Army Signal Corps laboratories at Fort Monmouth, New Jersey. Aleksandr Feklisov, one of the KGB case officers who handled the Rosenberg spy apparatus described Sarant and Joel Barr as among the most productive members of the group. Sarant was recruited as a Soviet espionage agent by Barr.

== Biography ==
A member of the Communist Party of the United States (CPUSA) during the Second World War, Sarant worked at the nuclear physics laboratory of Cornell University. In 1941, Julius Rosenberg and Joel Barr were recruited as Soviet spies by Jacob Golos. They in turn persuaded Sarant to join the network.

According to Aleksandr Feklisov:

Joel and Alfred were good friends and spent a lot of time together. I must admit that Sarant had the makings of an undercover agent; he was a cautious young man, yet full of resolve, with progressive ideas. Before we recruited him though, he had to pass a test. Barr asked Sarant to borrow some secret documents to which he had access because he, Barr, needed them for his personal use. Alfred did not hesitate in helping his friend and in the meantime the Center approved a bona fide approach."

However, he was at first reluctant to become a spy but was eventually convinced to join the network by Barr. Sarant was given the code name Hughes.

The Venona project transcript of 14 November 1944 reported to Moscow that Sarant had been successfully recruited. The transcript noted Sarant and Barr were roommates and good friends and proposed to pair them off and get them to photograph their own materials. Initially Barr delivered film to Rosenberg, who passed it on to officers of the Soviet intelligence. Later, Barr met directly with KGB officers; Sarant did not have direct contact with the KGB in the U.S. One transcript reports Sarant and Barr delivered 17 authentic drawings relating to the AN/APQ-7, an advanced and secret airborne radar system developed jointly by the Massachusetts Institute of Technology and Western Electric for the United States military.

In 1946 Sarant moved to Ithaca, New York, where he worked at Cornell University in the physics laboratories. Sarant's next door neighbor was Philip Morrison, a former Manhattan Project scientist and personal friend who joined the Communist Party of the United States in 1939. Sarant knew socially several prominent physicists, including Hans Bethe and Richard Feynman.

Two days after Julius Rosenberg's arrest on 17 July 1950, the FBI interviewed Sarant but did not arrest him, although it possessed decrypted MVD cables that clearly identified Sarant as a member of the Rosenberg ring. Three days later Sarant ran away with Carol Dayton, the wife of his close friend and neighbor, Bruce Dayton; Sarant and Dayton abandoned their children and spouses. The two crossed into Mexico and eluded the FBI.

In Mexico City, Sarant sought assistance from officials at an obscure Polish trade office, guessing correctly that they were intelligence officers. Following instructions from the KGB, the Poles hid Sarant and Dayton in Mexico, then engineered an escape that involved crossing the border to Guatemala on foot, taking a freighter to Casa Blanca, and flying to Poland via Spain. After six months in Warsaw they moved on to Moscow. The KGB arranged a dramatic reunion with Barr, who was summoned from Prague, where he had fled shortly after the Rosenberg ring started to unravel. Sarant was assigned a new identity, Philip Georgievich Staros, claiming a Canadian background to explain his accent. From Moscow, Barr and Sarant were resettled in Czechoslovakia and put to work as electrical engineers. They led a team that designed and built a prototype of the Soviet bloc's first automated anti-aircraft weapon. Their technology was quickly deployed and was in use, with some minor modifications, into the 1980s.

External images
- Leningrad, April 1962, Alfred Sarant (Staros) is on the left. On the right: Alexander S. Shokin, Titov (all sitting)
- Leningrad, May 1962, Alfred Sarant and colleagues meet Nikita Khrushchev.

In 1956 Sarant and Barr moved to Leningrad where they were placed in charge of a military electronics research institute. They have been credited with being the founders of the Soviet microelectronics industry, in part because Sarant and Barr conceived of, designed and won political backing for the creation of Zelenograd, the Soviet Union's Silicon Valley. Sarant was the scientific director of Zelenograd until Nikita Khrushchev's forced retirement. In 1969 Sarant received a state honor for the UM-1, a computer that was widely used in Soviet industry. He led the team that created the Uzel, the first digital computer installed in a Soviet submarine. The Uzel was integrated into the Kilo-class submarines and as of 2007 was still in use in the Russian, Iranian, Chinese and Indian navies. In 1979 Sarant died of a heart attack. Carol Dayton, the woman who fled with him, returned to the United States in 1991.

It was not until 1983, thirty-three years after Sarant's flight to Mexico, that the full story of Sarant's life was told. A Russian émigré working at Harvard, Mark Kuchment, who had read The Rosenberg File linked Barr and Sarant to two prominent Soviet scientists, both native speakers of English.

Sarant's cover name in Soviet intelligence and in the Venona project is "Hughes".

== Awards ==
- Order of the Red Banner of Labour (1958)
- USSR State Prize (1969)

== See also ==
- Atomic spies
- Julius and Ethel Rosenberg
- Joel Barr

== Sources ==
- Steven T. Usdin, Engineering Communism: How Two Americans Spied for Stalin And Founded the Soviet Silicon Valley, Yale University Press (October 10, 2005), hardcover. ISBN 0-300-10874-5
- Tracking Julius Rosenberg's Lesser Known Associates
- John Earl Haynes and Harvey Klehr, Venona: Decoding Soviet Espionage in America (New Haven: Yale University Press, 1999). ISBN 0-300-08462-5
- Feklisov, Alexander, The Man Behind the Rosenbergs: Memoirs of the KGB Spymaster Who Also Controlled Klaus Fuchs and Helped Resolve the Cuban Missile Crisis (New York, Enigma, 2001)
- FBI Venona file
- PBS Nova Online, The November 14, 1944 cable: Joel Barr and Alfred Sarant
