= Zelenograd =

Zelenograd Зеленоград
- Administrative okrug of Moscow
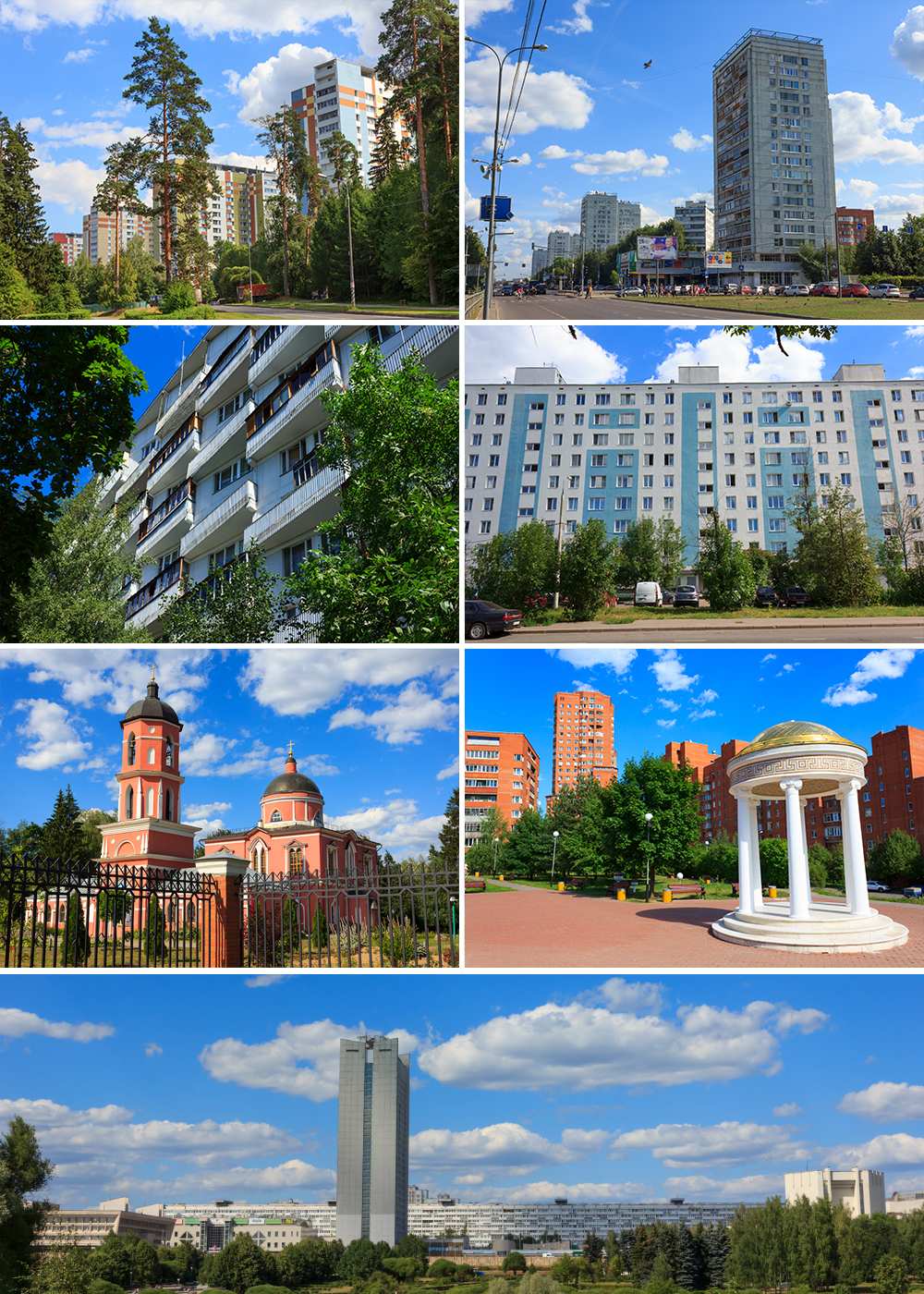
- Views of Zelenograd

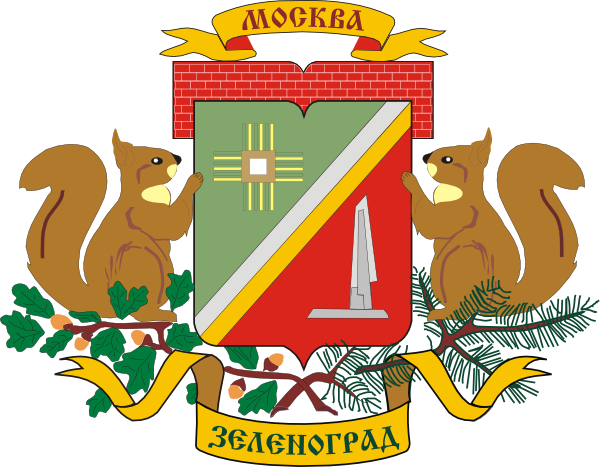
- Flag Coat of arms
- Interactive map of Zelenograd
- Location of Zelenograd Zelenograd (European Russia) Zelenograd (Europe)
- Coordinates: 55°59′52″N 37°11′25″E
- Country: Russia
- Federal subject: Moscow
- Founded: March 3, 1958
- City status since: January 15, 1963

Government
  - Prefect: Anatoly Smirnov

Area
  - Total: 37.22 km^{2} (14.37 sq mi)

Population (2010 Census)
  - Total: 221,712
  - Estimate (2024): 270,527 (+22%)
  - Density: 5,957/km^{2} (15,430/sq mi)

Administrative status
  - Subordinated to: Moscow
- Postal code: 124xxx
- Dialing codes: +7 (495), (499)
- Website: zelao.mos.ru

Zelenograd (Russian: Зеленоград, IPA: [zʲɪlʲɪnɐˈgrat], lit. 'green city') is a city and administrative okrug of Moscow, Russia. The city of Zelenograd and the territory under its jurisdiction form the Zelenogradsky Administrative Okrug (ZelAO), an exclave located within Moscow Oblast, 37 kilometers (23 mi) north-west of central Moscow, along the M10 highway. Zelenograd is the smallest administrative okrug of Moscow by area, the second-lowest by population, and the largest Moscow exclave by area and by population within Moscow Oblast. Zelenograd, if it were a separate settlement, would be the fifth-largest city in Moscow Oblast and one of the 100 largest cities of Russia. Before the expansion of the territory of Moscow in 2012, Zelenograd occupied second place among the administrative okrugs of Moscow, second only to the Eastern Administrative Okrug, in terms of the share of greenery in its total area (approximately 30%).

Zelenograd was founded in 1958 as a new town in the Soviet Union, and developed as a center of electronics, microelectronics and the computer industry known as the "Soviet/Russian Silicon Valley". It remains an important center of electronics in Russia. The city color is green and its emblematic animal is the squirrel.

Historical population
Year	Pop.	±%
1970	98,000	—
1979	141,000	+43.9%
1989	159,000	+12.8%
2002	215,727	+35.7%
2010	221,712	+2.8%
2021	256,775	+15.8%
Source: Census data

== History ==
Zelenograd was founded in 1958 as an unnamed planned city near the village and railway station of Kryukovo on a previously empty, forested place, and its architecture and civic layout yields to one general architectural plan (chief architects Igor Rozhin (1956–1963), then Igor Pokrovsky (1963–2002)), which has appreciable influence from the garden city movement, the development of the Tapiola district in Finland, and new towns in the United Kingdom (Harlow and others).

The city was planned as a center of the textile industry initially, but in 1962, Alexander Shokin (Chairman of State Committee of Electronic Technology, then first Minister of Electronic Technology) proposed to change the line of future city business to electronics. Some researchers of Soviet electronics history mentioned that a similar idea was proposed to the Soviet government by two fugitive Silicon Valley engineers—Alfred Sarant (more known in Russia as Philip Staros) and Joel Barr (Joseph Berg).

On January 15, 1963, the city received official city status and name Zelenograd, and on November 25, 1968, Zelenograd received the status of district of Moscow (one of the 30 districts) simultaneously.

In 1988, Zelenograd incorporated the former village of Kryukovo, one of the important sites during the Battle of Moscow (October 1941 – January 1942). Several monuments to the Defenders of Moscow and the heroes of the Great Patriotic War are located in Zelenograd and the surrounding area, the most famous of which is the Shtyki Memorial, from which the remains of the Unknown Soldier were taken for reinterment at the Kremlin Wall in the Alexander Garden in Moscow.

Before 1989, Zelenograd was a de facto closed city in some aspects: it was prohibited to take photos in the central parts of the city, near the plants, teaching and research facilities, and foreigners were not admitted into the city.

In 1991, Zelenograd was reformed in one of the administrative okrugs of Moscow.

== Geography ==
The Skhodnya River originates near the village of Alabushevo (one of settlements, which are under Zelenograd jurisdiction) and forms two ponds within the precincts of city—Small and Large City Pond.

=== Administrative divisions ===
Zelenogradsky Administrative Okrug is divided into five districts:

- Matushkino (Матушкино), previously District #1: 1st, 2nd, and 4th microdistricts, North Industrial Zone
- Savyolki (Савёлки), previously District #2: 3rd, 5th, 6th and 7th microdistricts, East Utility Zone, Nazar'evo village
- Staroye Kryukovo (Старое Крюково), previously District #3: 8th and 9th microdistricts, South Industrial Zone, north part of Malino settlement
- Silino (Силино), previously District #4: 10th, 11th, and 12th microdistricts, West and Alabushevo Industrial Zones
- Kryukovo (Крюково): 14th-23rd microdistricts (21st one is scheduled only), Andreevka Utility Zone, Malino Industrial Zone, south part of Malino settlement, Kamenka, Kutuzovo, Novo-Malino, and Rozhki villages

The first four districts (about 2/3 area and population) are unofficially formed Old City, and Kryukovo District (separated by Saint Petersburg – Moscow Railway) is unofficially named New City. The most of postal address in city has no name of street or square—the most of buildings have only 3- or 4-digit number: the first one or two digits are number of microdistrict, the last two ones are number of building within microdistrict borders. There is no 13th microdistrict in Zelenograd.

== Economy ==
=== Industries ===
Zelenograd is home to the National Research University of Electronic Technology (MIET).

Zelenograd was the headquarters of Sitronics Concerne since its founding in 1997 until 2005 (when its headquarters moved to Moscow) and Zelenograd is the headquarters of Mikron and Angstrem—both largest Russian integrated circuit manufacturers.

Zelenograd is one of technical-innovative type special economic zones. Since December 21, 2005 SEZ "Zelenograd" officially consists of 2 areas: Area "Alabushevo" (141.87 ha or 350.6 acres), a main area for new plants and research centers; and Area "MIET" (4.47 ha or 11.0 acres), a technology park (mostly MIET spin-off enterprises).

== Sports ==
It has a local football team Zelenograd and a local rugby team Zelenograd.

== Gallery ==
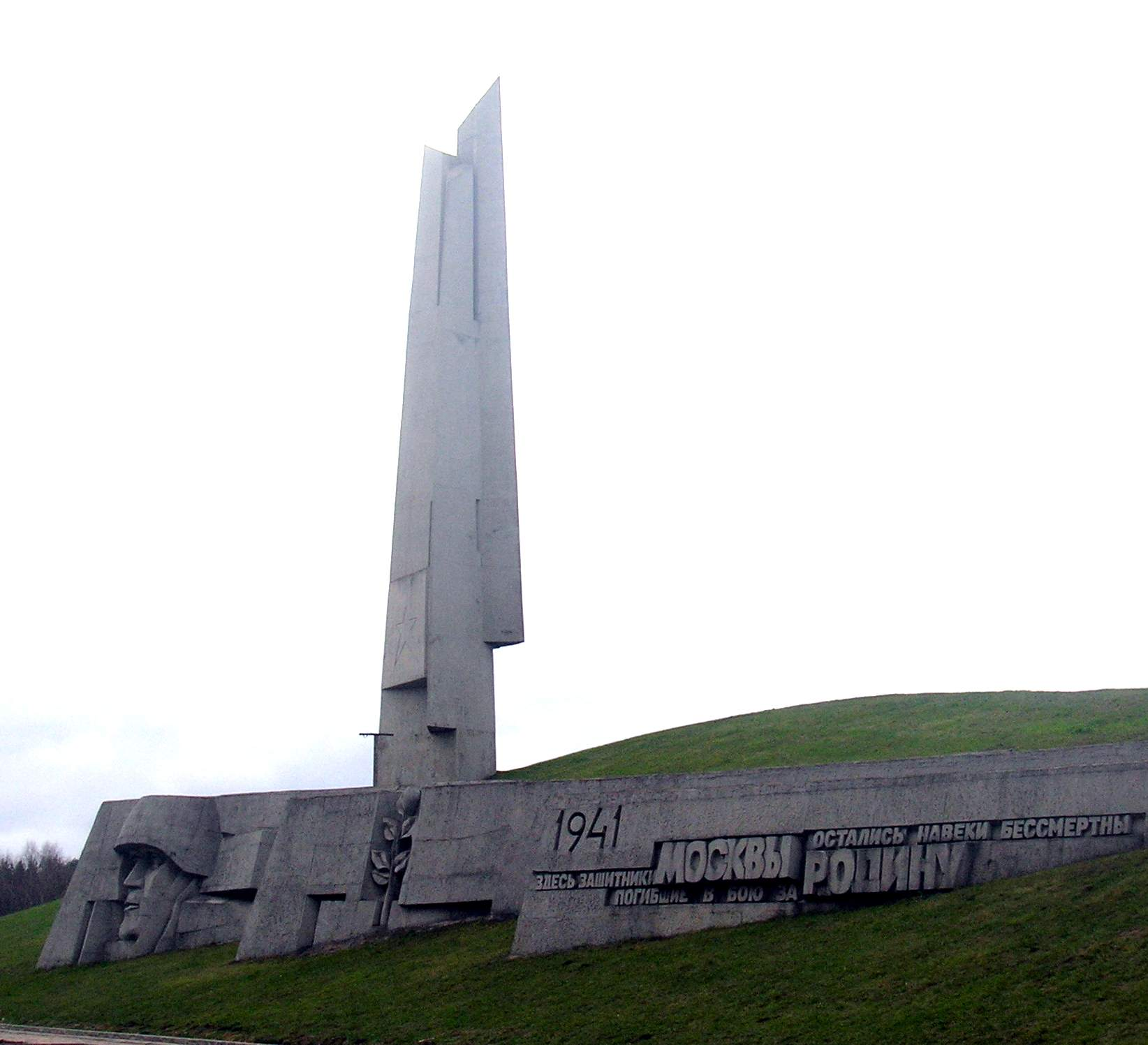
The Shtyki (Bayonets) memorial complex

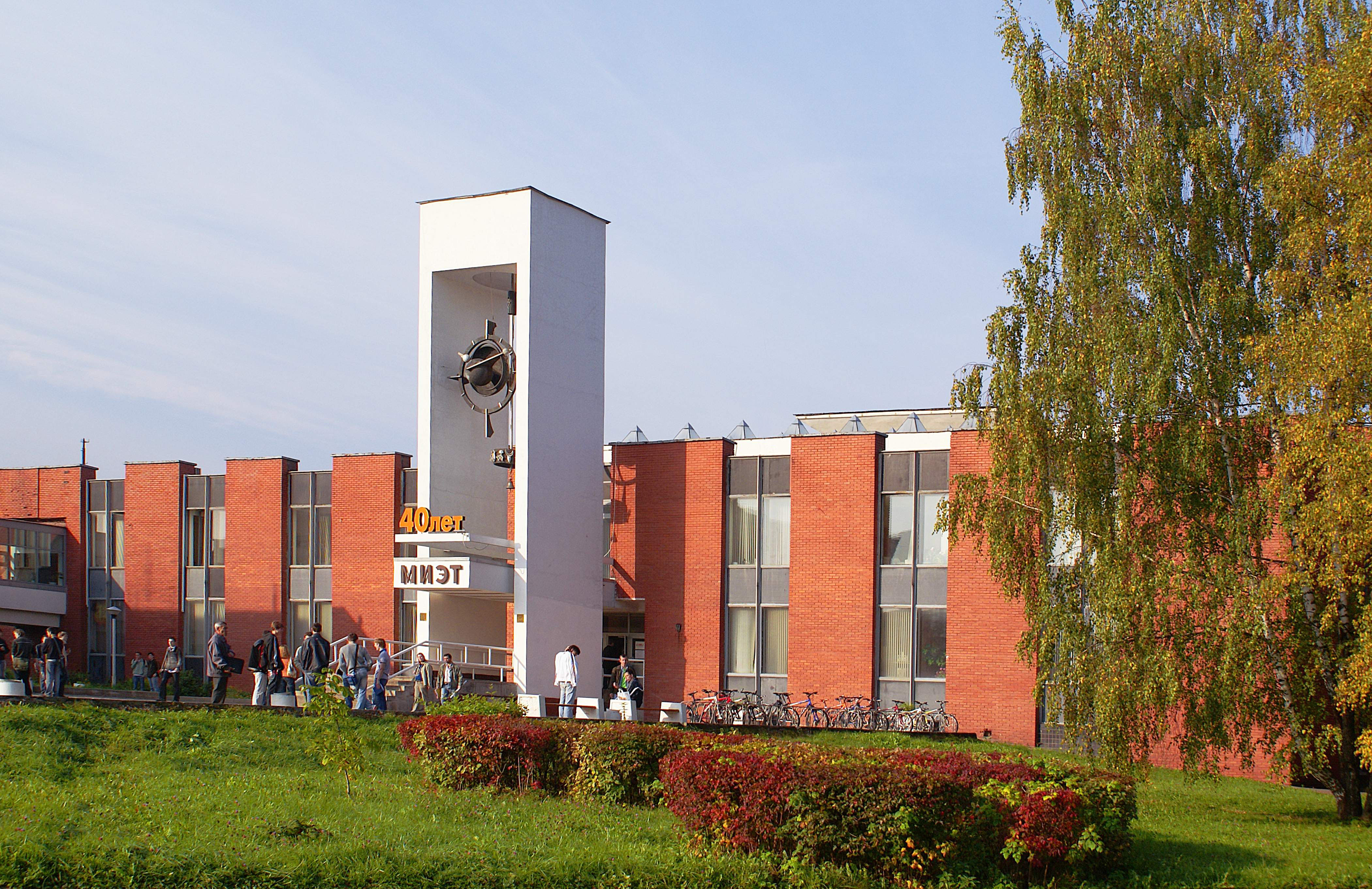
Moscow Institute of Electronic Technology (MIET)

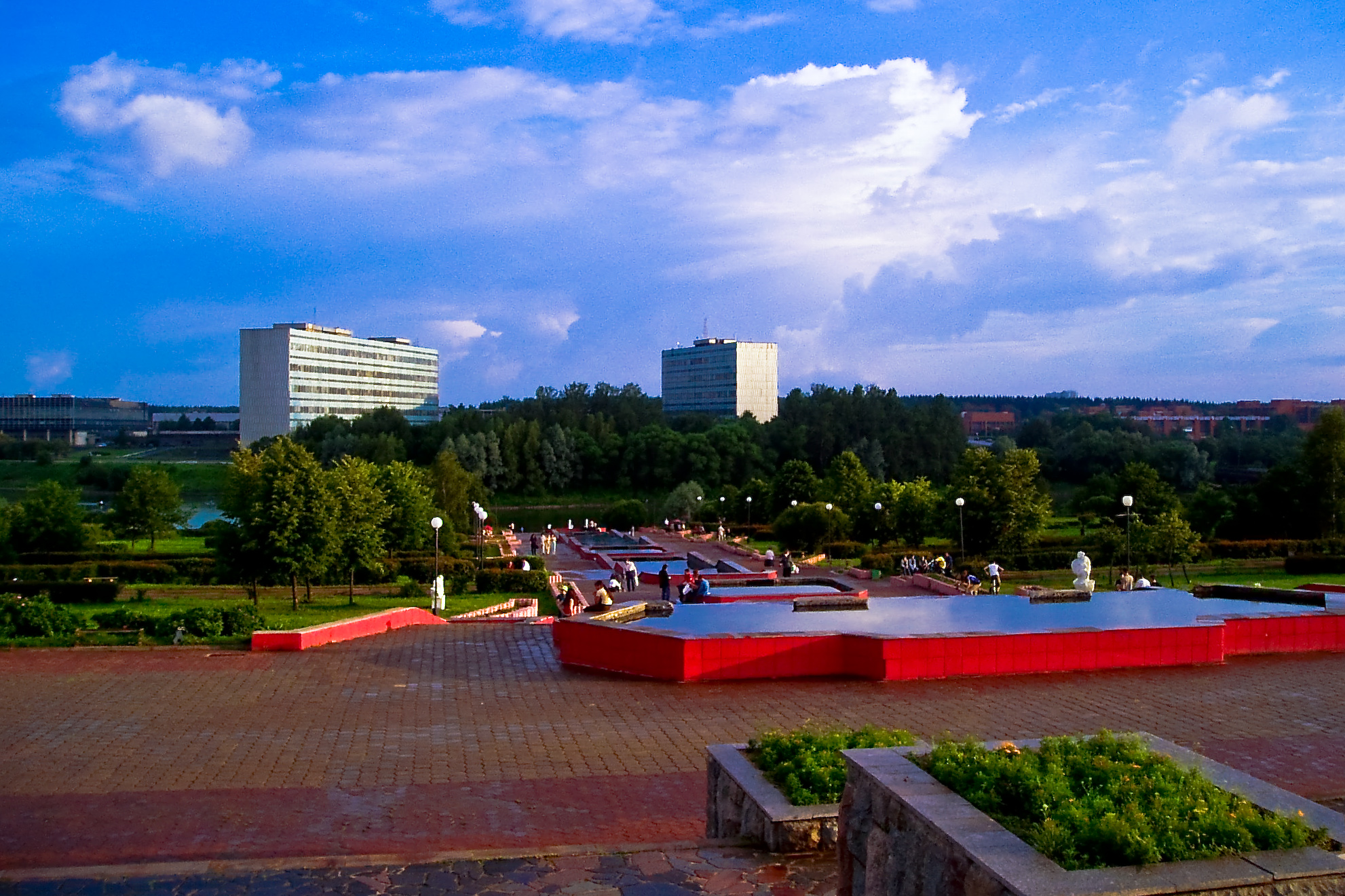
Cascade of fountains in the Park of Victory (Savyolki District)

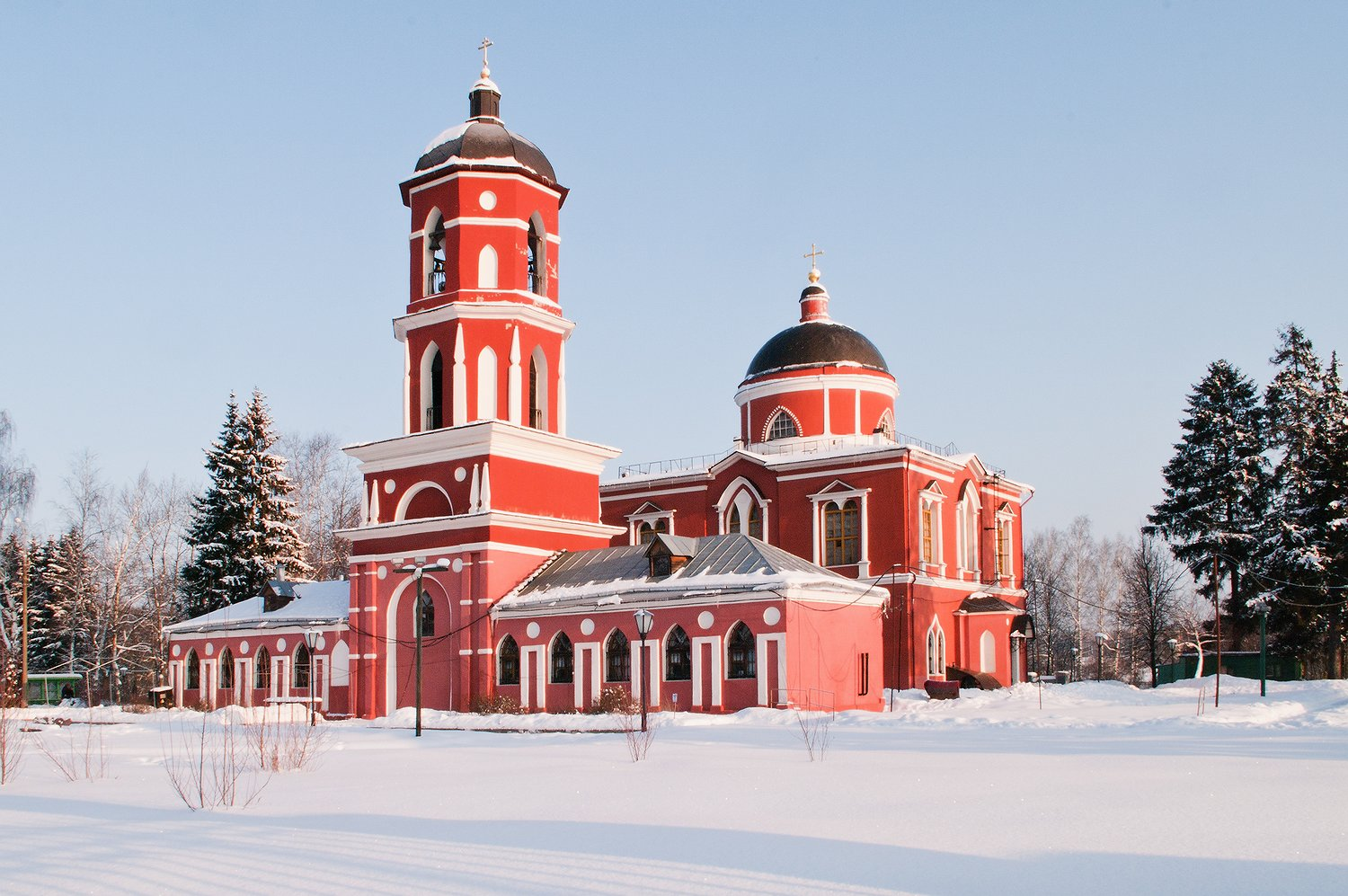
St. Nicholas Church

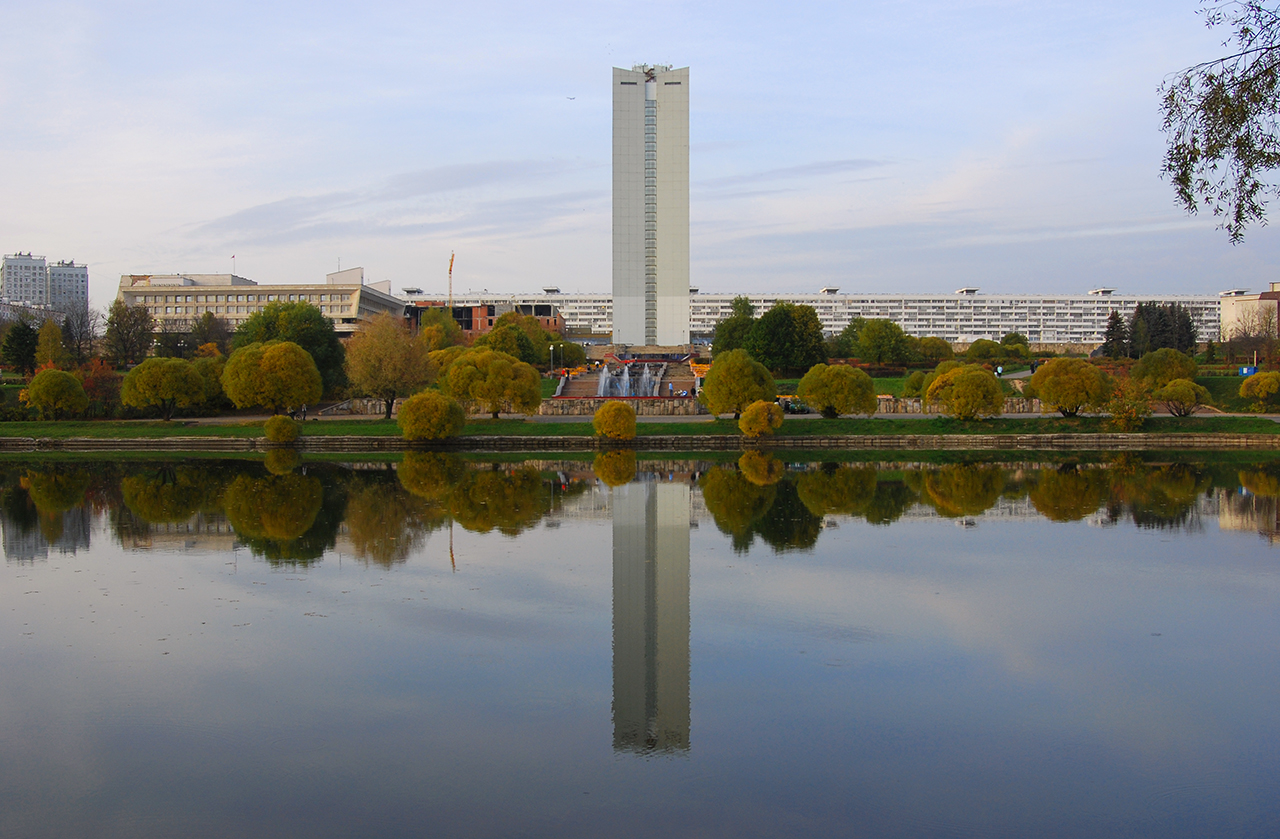
City Pond

== Sister cities ==
- Tulsa (Oklahoma, United States)
- Unterschleißheim (Bavaria, Germany)
