= Joel Barr =

American spy for the Soviet Union

- Born: January 1, 1916; New York, United States
- Died: August 1, 1998 (aged 82); Moscow, Russia

Joel Barr (January 1, 1916 – August 1, 1998), also Iozef Veniaminovich Berg and Joseph Berg, was part of the Soviet Atomic Spy Ring.

== Background ==
Born Joyel Barr in New York City, to immigrant parents of Ukrainian Jewish origin. He attended City College of New York with Julius Rosenberg and later worked with Rosenberg and Alfred Sarant at the United States Army Signal Corps laboratories at Fort Monmouth, New Jersey during World War II.

== Career ==
The Army Signal Corps Engineering Laboratories at Fort Monmouth, New Jersey, hired Barr as an electrical engineer in July 1940. Julius Rosenberg signed on with the corps as a junior engineer two months later.

=== Espionage ===
In 1941 they were recruited as Soviet spies by Jacob Golos. Barr's code name was Meter. They in turn persuaded Alfred Sarant to join the network.

According to Alexandr Feklisov:

Joel and Alfred were good friends and spent a lot of time together. I must admit that Sarant had the makings of an undercover agent; he was a cautious young man, yet full of resolve, with progressive ideas. Before we recruited him though, he had to pass a test. Barr asked Sarant to borrow some secret documents to which he had access because he, Barr, needed them for his personal use. Alfred did not hesitate in helping his friend and in the meantime the Center approved a bona fide approach."

Barr was recruited into espionage by Rosenberg. In turn, he recruited Sarant and the two shared an apartment and were allowed to function as a team by their KGB Case Officer, Alexander Feklisov. Feklisov regarded the pair as the most productive members of the group.

Both Barr and Sarant were trained and employed as electrical engineers and worked on military radar. Barr was discovered by counterintelligence to be a Communist and was fired. He and Sarant then found employment with Western Electric and worked on a highly secret radar bombsight. Barr and Sarant gave the USSR over 9,000 pages of documents detailing over 100 weapons systems.

When the war ended the two founded Sarant Laboratories, and sought defense contracts, but the company soon failed, after which the two split up. Barr worked for a while in late 1946 with Sperry Gyroscope Company on secret military radar systems, but was fired in 1947 after the United States Air Force refused him a security clearance.

=== Defection ===
Barr then moved to Europe, studying engineering in Sweden and music composition in Paris with Olivier Messiaen. Barr disappeared from his Paris apartment the day after David Greenglass was arrested, and fled to Czechoslovakia without taking his belongings. The KGB gave him a new identity; for the rest of his life Barr was known as Joseph Berg. In the summer of 1951, Barr met up with Sarant and the woman Sarant ran away with, Carol Dayton. Barr and Sarant, living under the name Philip Staros, settled in Prague, where they headed a successful effort to design the first automated anti-aircraft weapon created in the Soviet bloc, a weapon that was used with minor modifications through the 1980s.

=== Zelenograd ===
In 1956, the two transferred to Leningrad and were put at the head of a military electronics research institute, and enjoyed the benefits of the Soviet nomenklatura. In May 1962, Soviet Premier Nikita Khrushchev toured their institute and agreed to their plan to establish a new city dedicated entirely to microelectronics. The city, Zelenograd, was built on the outskirts of Moscow and Sarant was named deputy director, with authority over more than 20,000 engineers and scientists. Barr and Sarant lost their positions at Zelenograd when Khrushchev was deposed, but they continued to work on military projects, including the Uzel fire-control computer that was installed in Tango and Kilo submarines.

In 1983, a Russian émigré, Mark Kuchment, working at Harvard University's Russian Research Center, who had read The Rosenberg File, linked Barr and Sarant to two prominent Soviet scientists, both native speakers of English.

=== Post-Soviet era ===
After the collapse of the Soviet Union in 1992, Barr returned to the United States but denied his participation in espionage. He split the next six years between the U.S. and Russia, and died in 1998 in Moscow, Russia.

There are seven deciphered KGB transmissions about Joel Barr. Barr's code name in the Soviet intelligence and in deciphered Venona project transcripts was originally "Meter" (also "Metre" and "Metr"); it was later changed to "Scout" (also "Skaut"). The November 14, 1944 Venona cable also documents the successful recruitment of Ruth Greenglass.

== See also ==
- Atomic spies
- Julius Rosenberg
- Alfred Sarant
