= William Ecker =

United States Navy officer

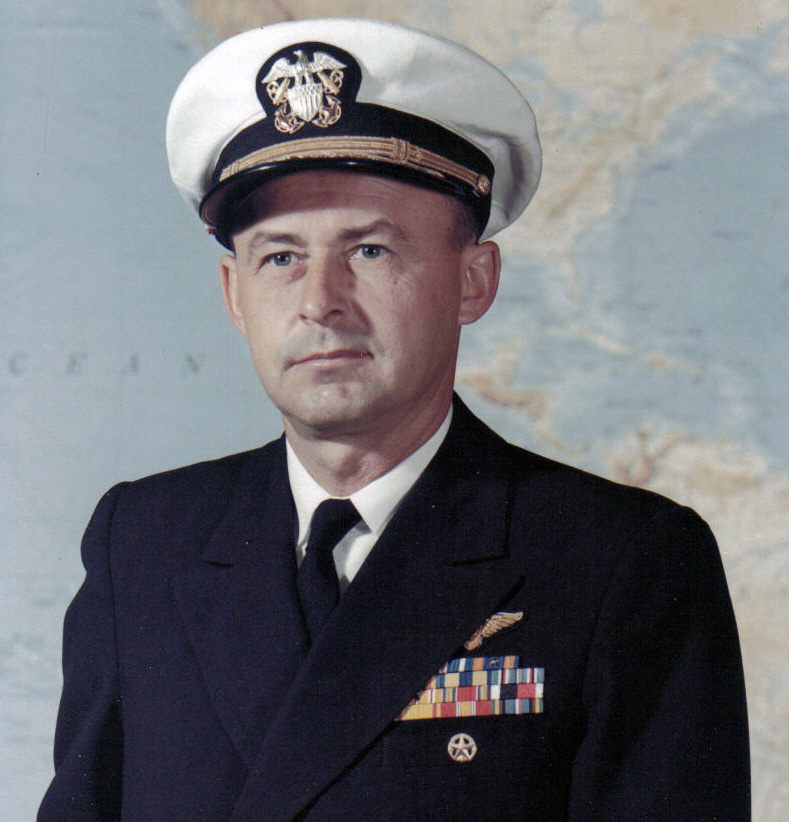
- CAPT William B. Ecker, 1965
- Born: April 6, 1924; Omaha, Nebraska
- Died: November 5, 2009 (aged 85)
- Military career
- Allegiance: United States
- Branch: United States Navy
- Service years: 1942-1974
- Rank: Captain
- Commands: Light Photographic Squadron (VFP) 62
- Conflicts: World War II; Cuban Missile Crisis
- Awards: Distinguished Flying Cross; Air Medal

William Ecker (April 6, 1924 – November 5, 2009) was a United States Navy officer.

Born in Omaha, Nebraska, Ecker was a career Naval officer and aviator, serving in the United States Navy from 1942 until 1974. He is best known for his role in the Cuban Missile Crisis in 1962.

== Cuban Missile Crisis ==
On October 23, 1962, as commanding officer of Photo Reconnaissance Squadron 62 (VFP-62), then-Commander Ecker led the first low-level reconnaissance flight over Cuba during the Cuban Missile Crisis and (together with his wing man, Lieutenant Bruce Wilhelmy, and four other VFP-62 pilots) took the first close-up photos of the Soviet missile bases in Cuba. During this mission, they both flew RF-8 Crusader aircraft.

After the end of the Cuban Missile Crisis, Ecker received the Distinguished Flying Cross for his service. The unit he commanded, VFP-62, received the Navy Unit Commendation. This Navy Unit Commendation was the first one awarded for a peacetime operation and it was personally presented by President John F. Kennedy in a ceremony on November 26, 1962.

== Later life ==
Captain William B. Ecker, USN (Retired) lived in the Virginia suburbs of Washington D.C. From 1988 to 1998, he was a docent at the Smithsonian National Air and Space Museum's facility in Suitland, Maryland where he led public tours of aircraft, spacecraft and other artifacts in a location where they were stored, preserved and restored for the museum. He moved to Punta Gorda, Florida in 2001 and resided there until his death on November 5, 2009. Before his death, Captain Ecker began writing a book with Kenneth V. Jack entitled "Blue Moon Over Cuba: Aerial Reconnaissance during the Cuban Missile Crisis." This book was released on August 21, 2012.

== Depictions in popular culture ==
In 2000, his actions were depicted in the movie Thirteen Days, which was produced by Kevin Costner. In this movie, he was played by Christopher Lawford, the nephew of JFK.
