= Thirteen Days (film) =

2000 US film directed by Roger Donaldson

- Theatrical release poster
- Directed by: Roger Donaldson
- Written by: David Self
- Based on: The Kennedy Tapes: Inside the White House During the Cuban Missile Crisis by Ernest R. May and Philip D. Zelikow
- Produced by: Armyan Bernstein; Peter Almond; Kevin Costner
- Starring: Kevin Costner; Bruce Greenwood; Steven Culp; Dylan Baker
- Cinematography: Andrzej Bartkowiak
- Edited by: Conrad Buff
- Music by: Trevor Jones
- Production company: Beacon Pictures
- Distributed by: New Line Cinema (United States and Canada); Buena Vista Film Sales (International)
- Release dates: December 19, 2000 (premiere); January 12, 2001 (United States)
- Running time: 145 minutes
- Country: United States
- Languages: English; Russian; Spanish; Romanian
- Budget: $80 million
- Box office: $66.6 million

Thirteen Days is a 2000 American historical political thriller film directed by Roger Donaldson. It dramatizes the Cuban Missile Crisis of 1962, seen from the perspective of the American political leadership. Kevin Costner stars as top White House assistant Kenneth P. O'Donnell, with Bruce Greenwood featured as President John F. Kennedy, Steven Culp as Attorney General Robert F. Kennedy and Dylan Baker as Secretary of Defense Robert McNamara.

While the film carries the same title as the 1969 book Thirteen Days by former attorney general Robert F. Kennedy, it is in fact based on the 1997 book The Kennedy Tapes: Inside the White House During the Cuban Missile Crisis by Ernest R. May and Philip D. Zelikow. It is the second docudrama made about the crisis, the first being 1974's The Missiles of October, which was based on Kennedy's book. The 2000 film contains some newly declassified information not available to the earlier production, but takes greater dramatic license, particularly in its choice of O'Donnell as protagonist. Thirteen Days premiered on December 19, 2000, before being released by New Line Cinema in the United States on January 12, 2001, with Buena Vista Film Sales releasing in other territories. The film received generally positive reviews from critics who praised the screenplay and performances of the cast but was a box-office bomb, grossing $66.6 million against its $80 million budget.

== Plot ==
In October 1962, U-2 aerial surveillance photos reveal that the Soviet Union is placing intermediate-range ballistic missiles carrying nuclear weapons in Cuba. U.S. president John F. Kennedy and his advisers must come up with a plan to prevent their activation. Kennedy wants to show that the United States will not allow a missile threat. The Joint Chiefs of Staff advise military strikes against the missile sites followed by an invasion of Cuba. Kennedy is reluctant to this because it would likely cause the Soviets to invade West Berlin, which could lead to an all-out war. Kennedy sees an analogy to the events that started World War I, where the tactics of both sides' commanders had not evolved since the previous war and were obsolete, only this time nuclear weapons are involved. War appears to be almost inevitable.

The Kennedy administration tries to find a solution that will remove the missiles but avoid an act of war. They reject a blockade, as this is formally regarded as an act of war, and settle on what they publicly describe as a quarantine. They announce that the U.S. naval forces will stop all ships entering Cuban waters and inspect them to verify they are not carrying weapons. The Soviet Union sends mixed messages in response. Off the shores of Cuba, the Soviet ships turn back from the quarantine lines. Spy plane pictures continue to be ordered, but one of Kennedy's top advisers, Kenneth O'Donnell, calls the pilots to ensure they do not report that they were shot at or fired upon, because if they were, the country would be forced to retaliate under the rules of engagement.

John A. Scali, a reporter with ABC News, is contacted by Soviet "emissary" Aleksandr Fomin, and through this back-channel communication method the Soviets offer to remove the missiles in exchange for public assurances that the U.S. will never invade Cuba. A long message in the same tone as the informal communication from Fomin, apparently written personally by Soviet Premier Nikita Khrushchev, is received. This is followed by a second, more hard line cable in which the Soviets offer a deal involving U.S. removal of its Jupiter missiles from Turkey. The Kennedy administration interprets the second as a response from the Soviet Politburo, and decides to ignore it and respond to the message assumed to be from Khrushchev. There are several mis-steps during the crisis: the defense readiness level of Strategic Air Command (SAC) is raised to DEFCON 2 (one step shy of maximum readiness for imminent war), without informing Kennedy; a U.S. nuclear weapon test proceeds (Bluegill Triple Prime) and a routine test launch of a U.S. offensive missile is also carried out without the President's knowledge.

In a bid for time while under pressure from the military for an immediate strike, President Kennedy authorizes attacks on the missile sites and an invasion of Cuba, to commence the following Monday. An Air Force U-2 reconnaissance plane is sent over Cuba to gather intelligence for the attack, but is shot down, killing the pilot Rudolf Anderson. After much deliberation with the Executive Committee of the National Security Council, Kennedy makes a final attempt to avoid a war by sending his brother Robert to meet with Soviet ambassador Anatoly Dobrynin on Friday night. Bobby reiterates the demand that the Soviets remove their missiles from Cuba, and in return promises not to invade or assist in the invasion of Cuba. Dobrynin insists that the U.S. must also remove all Jupiter missiles from Turkey, on the border of the Soviet Union. Bobby says that a quid pro quo is not possible, but in exchange for Khrushchev removing the missiles from Cuba, there will be a secret understanding that the U.S. will remove all of its "obsolete" missiles from Turkey within six months as part of a pre-scheduled plan. The Soviets announce on Sunday that they will remove their missiles from Cuba, averting a war that could have escalated to the use of nuclear weapons. President Kennedy later dictates a letter of condolence to the family of the reconnaissance pilot Anderson.

== Cast ==
- Kevin Costner as Special Assistant to the President Kenneth O'Donnell
- Bruce Greenwood as President John F. Kennedy
- Steven Culp as Attorney General Robert F. Kennedy
- Dylan Baker as Secretary of Defense Robert McNamara
- Michael Fairman as United States Ambassador to the United Nations Adlai Stevenson II
- Henry Strozier as Secretary of State Dean Rusk
- Frank Wood as National Security Advisor McGeorge Bundy
- Kevin Conway as Chief of Staff of the USAF, General Curtis LeMay
- Tim Kelleher as White House Counsel Ted Sorensen
- Len Cariou as Former Secretary of State Dean Acheson
- Bill Smitrovich as Chairman of the Joint Chiefs of Staff General Maxwell Taylor
- Dakin Matthews as Arthur C. Lundahl
- Madison Mason as Chief of Naval Operations Admiral George Whelan Anderson Jr.
- Christopher Lawford as RF-8 Crusader pilot, Commander William Ecker
  - Lawford, son of Peter Lawford and Patricia Kennedy Lawford, was a nephew to President Kennedy and Robert Kennedy
- Ed Lauter as deputy director of the CIA Lieutenant General Marshall Carter
- Elya Baskin as Anatoly Dobrynin, Ambassador of the Soviet Union to the United States
- Boris Krutonog as Alexander Feklisov (a.k.a. Alexander Fomin), KGB spy
- Peter White as Director of the Central Intelligence Agency John McCone
- James Karen as George Ball
- Tim Jerome as Journalist
- Olek Krupa as Soviet Foreign Minister Andrei Gromyko
- Lucinda Jenney as Helen O'Donnell, wife to Kenneth O'Donnell
- Oleg Vidov as Valerian Zorin, Soviet Ambassador to the United Nations
- Daniel Vergara as Secretary General of the Organization of American States José Antonio Mora
- Jack Blessing as ABC News correspondent John A. Scali
- Pramod Kumar as United Nations Secretary General U Thant
- Charles Esten as U-2 pilot Major Rudolf Anderson
- Stephanie Romanov as First Lady Jacqueline Kennedy
- Jack McGee as Richard J. Daley, Mayor of Chicago
- Janet Coleman as Evelyn Lincoln, President Kennedy's Secretary
- Tom Everett as Walter Sheridan, Special assistant to President Kennedy
- John Aylward as Orvil Dryfoos, publisher of The New York Times
- Larry Strauss as Treasury Secretary C. Douglas Dillon
- Alex Veadov as Radio Room Operator #3
- Walter Adrian as Vice President Lyndon B. Johnson
- Kelly Connell as Press Secretary Pierre Salinger
- Dan Ziskie as General Commander of the Tactical Air Command Walter 'Cam' Sweeney
- Caitlin Wachs as Kathy O'Donnell
- Jon Foster as Kenny O'Donnell Jr.
- Marya Kazakova as Soviet Woman

== Production ==
The film was co-produced by several studios, including New Line Cinema, Kevin Costner's Tig Productions and Armyan Bernstein's Beacon Pictures. Several directors had been involved at various points. Steven Spielberg and Lawrence Kasdan expressed interest, while Francis Ford Coppola and Martin Campbell had been in discussions to direct. Coppola later passed to peruse Megalopolis instead after seeing an early screening of Star Wars: Episode I - The Phantom Menace. Phil Alden Robinson had been attached, but left due to creative differences. Roger Donaldson officially signed on in May 1999. Production began on September 20, 1999.

The Department of Defense co-operated to some extent by allowing the producers to film on several bases. To keep the film "in period," filming took place on ships from the time of the crisis that still existed in the active fleet (USS Enterprise) and ships that are preserved as museums (USS Joseph P. Kennedy, Jr.). Aircraft (both a preserved F-8 Crusader and Lockheed U-2 spyplane were featured) that still exist from the period were refurbished to appear operational as well. The RF-8 Crusader (and an F-5) and the scenes of Cuba were shot in the Philippines. The air base scene was taken at Clark Air Base, Philippines, a former American facility, which substituted for NAS Key West, Florida, where the actual RF-8As of Light Photographic Squadron SIX TWO (VFP-62) launched from on their Cuban overflight missions. At the time of the shooting, the F-8 was still in the inventory of the Philippine Air Force but was no longer operational. The F-5 was retired in 2005.

The Department of Defense attempted to get the film to change its portrayal of the US military, which they believed portrayed it in a negative light. When the producers refused, military assistance was denied to the production. As a result, the studio was forced to utilize broken-down aircraft from the Philippines which dated to the relevant historical era. The aircraft were painted and attached to trucks which pulled them along in order to make it look like they still functioned.

== Distribution ==
Universal Pictures had been the initial domestic distributor, as they had a first-look deal with Beacon, but they dropped the film due to budgetary concerns. Several other studios offered to pick up the film, with Sony Pictures winning out due to the positive relationship the producers had working on Air Force One. However, Sony bailed out when there was no director set. Universal had a chance to buy the film back but chose not to. New Line Cinema officially picked up domestic distribution rights in March 1999. Canadian distribution was handled by Alliance Atlantis, while Buena Vista International's Buena Vista Film Sales handled the international sales of the film, with BVI self-distributing in the United Kingdom.

The film was screened for then President George W. Bush in the White House. Bush invited Senator Ted Kennedy, brother of John and Robert F. Kennedy, to the showing. Costner offered to screen the film for U.S. soldiers stationed at Ramstein Air Base in Germany, but this offer was rejected as the military was unhappy with its portrayal in the film.

== Reception ==
=== Box office ===
The film was given a limited theatrical release on Christmas Day 2000, and a wide release on January 12, 2001, with a staggered release to various countries throughout most of the year. The film grossed $66,579,890 worldwide against a production budget of $80 million.

=== Critical response ===
Rotten Tomatoes reports that 83% of 124 critics have given the film positive reviews, with an average rating of 7.2/10. The website's consensus states: "Thirteen Days offers a compelling look at the Cuban Missile Crisis, and its talented cast deftly portrays the real-life people who were involved." Metacritic, which assigns a rating out of 100 to reviews from mainstream film critics, gives Thirteen Days a score of 67, based on 31 reviews, indicating "generally favorable reviews". Audiences surveyed by CinemaScore gave the film an average grade of "A−" on an A+ to F scale.

Roger Ebert of the Chicago Sun-Times gave Thirteen Days a rating of 3 stars out of 4, and said "The movie's taut, flat style is appropriate for a story that is more about facts and speculation than about action. Kennedy and his advisers study high-altitude photos and intelligence reports, and wonder if Khrushchev's word can be trusted. Everything depends on what they decide. The movie shows men in unknotted ties and shirt-sleeves, grasping coffee cups or whiskey glasses and trying to sound rational while they are at some level terrified...[T]hings might not have happened exactly like this, but it sure did feel like they did."

=== Political response ===
Some former Kennedy administration officials and contemporary historians, including Arthur Schlesinger Jr., Special Counsel Ted Sorensen and Secretary of Defense Robert McNamara, criticized the film for the depiction of Special Assistant Kenneth O'Donnell (Costner) as chief motivator of Kennedy (Bruce Greenwood) and others during the crisis. Prior to seeing the movie, McNamara reacted to the premise in a PBS NewsHour interview: "For God's sakes, Kenny O'Donnell didn't have any role whatsoever in the missile crisis; he was a political appointment secretary to the President; that's absurd".

According to McNamara, the duties performed by O'Donnell in the film were closer to the role Sorensen played during the actual crisis: "It was not Kenny O'Donnell who pulled us all together—it was Ted Sorensen." After seeing the movie, McNamara remarked that while he still thought the filmmakers took some creative liberties with certain characters, he ultimately thought that it was a reasonable historical portrayal of the crisis: "I think it's an absolutely fascinating portrayal and a very constructive and responsible portrayal of a very, very serious crisis not only in the history of this nation but in the history of the world".

Kenny O'Donnell's son, the venture capitalist Kevin O'Donnell, bought back controlling interest in the production company Beacon Pictures in 1999 alongside earlier founder Armyan Bernstein. Kevin O'Donnell and Beacon Pictures have denied any undue influence on the screenplay portrayals of the released Thirteen Days the next year.

Costner traveled to Cuba in 2001 to screen the film for Fidel Castro, saying at a press conference, "It was an experience of a lifetime to sit only a few feet away from him and watch him relive an experience he lived as a very young man."

== Home media ==
The DVD and VHS was released on July 10, 2001. The DVD release marked the debut for New Line Home Entertainment's Infinifilm label.

== See also ==
- Cultural depictions of John F. Kennedy
- Robert F. Kennedy in media
- Vought F-8 Crusader
