= Uzel (computer) =

Uzel was the Soviet Union's first digital computer used on submarines, to assist in tracking multiple targets and calculate torpedo solutions. Uzel's design team was headed by two American defectors to the Soviet Union, Alfred Sarant (a.k.a. Philip Staros) and Joel Barr (a.k.a. Joseph Berg). An upgraded version of the Uzel computer is still in use on the Kilo class submarine today.
