= Thirteen Days (book) =

1969 book by Robert F. Kennedy

Thirteen Days: A Memoir of the Cuban Missile Crisis
- Author: Robert F. Kennedy
- Language: English
- Publisher: W. W. Norton
- Publication date: 1969
- Publication place: United States
- Media type: Print (Hardback & Paperback)
- Preceded by: N/A

Thirteen Days: A Memoir of the Cuban Missile Crisis is Robert F. Kennedy's account of the Cuban Missile Crisis of 1962. The book was released in 1969, the year after his assassination. Thirteen Days describes the meetings held by the Executive Committee (ExComm), the team assembled by US president John F. Kennedy to handle the tense situation that developed between the United States and the Soviet Union following the discovery of Soviet nuclear missiles in Cuba, 90 miles (140 km) from Florida. Robert Kennedy, who was the US attorney general at the time, describes his brother John's leadership style during the crisis as involved, but not controlling.

Robert Kennedy viewed the military leaders on the council sympathetically, and recognized that their lifelong concentration on war was difficult to set aside. The book was used as the basis for the 1974 television play The Missiles of October. In 2000, the theatrical film Thirteen Days was produced using the same title, but based on an entirely different book, The Kennedy Tapes: Inside the White House During the Cuban Missile Crisis by Ernest R. May and Philip D. Zelikow. That book contained some information that Kennedy was not able to reveal because it was classified at the time.
