= Presidency of John F. Kennedy =

U.S. presidential administration from 1961 to 1963

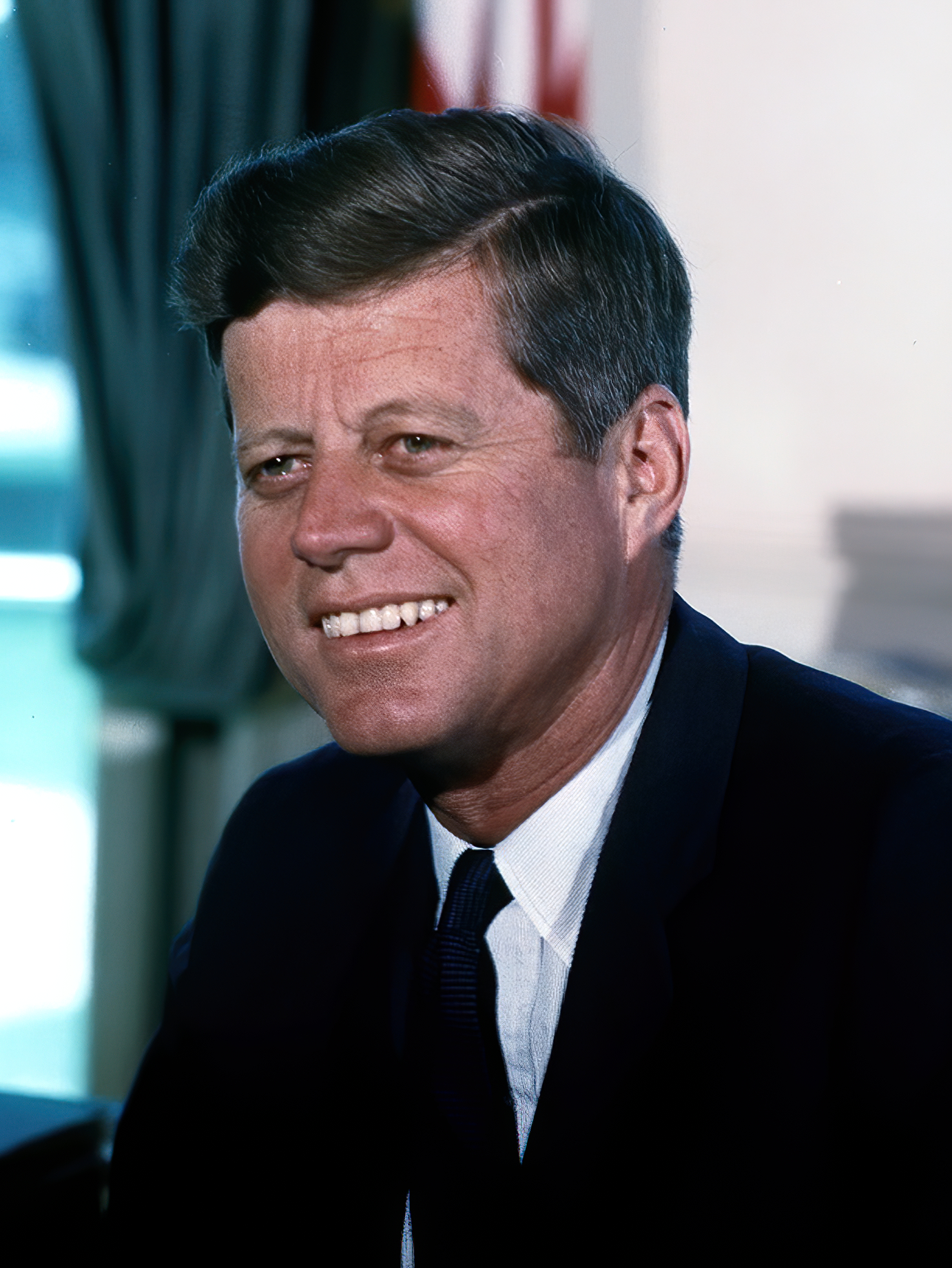
- Official portrait, 1963
- Presidency of John F. Kennedy; January 20, 1961 – November 22, 1963 (Assassination)
- Vice President: Lyndon B. Johnson
- Cabinet: See list
- Party: Democratic
- Election: 1960
- Seat: White House
- Seal of the President

John F. Kennedy's tenure as the 35th president of the United States began with his inauguration on January 20, 1961, and ended with his assassination on November 22, 1963. Kennedy, a Democrat from Massachusetts, took office following his narrow victory over Republican incumbent vice president Richard Nixon in the 1960 presidential election. He was succeeded by Vice President Lyndon B. Johnson.

Kennedy's time in office was marked by Cold War tensions with the Soviet Union and Cuba. In Cuba, a failed attempt was made in April 1961 at the Bay of Pigs to overthrow the government of Fidel Castro. In October 1962, the Kennedy administration learned that Soviet ballistic missiles had been deployed in Cuba; the resulting Cuban Missile Crisis carried a risk of nuclear war, but ended in a compromise with the Soviets publicly withdrawing their missiles from Cuba and the U.S. secretly withdrawing some missiles based in Italy and Turkey. To contain Communist expansion in Asia, Kennedy increased the number of American military advisers in South Vietnam by a factor of 18; a further escalation of the American role in the Vietnam War would take place after Kennedy's death. In Latin America, Kennedy's Alliance for Progress aimed to promote human rights and foster economic development.

In domestic politics, Kennedy had made bold proposals in his New Frontier agenda, but many of his initiatives were blocked by the conservative coalition of Northern Republicans and Southern Democrats. The failed initiatives include federal aid to education, medical care for the aged, and aid to economically depressed areas. Though initially reluctant to pursue civil rights legislation, in 1963 Kennedy proposed a major civil rights bill that ultimately became the Civil Rights Act of 1964. During Kennedy's tenure, the economy experienced steady growth, low inflation, and declining unemployment. Kennedy adopted Keynesian economics and proposed a tax cut bill that was passed into law as the Revenue Act of 1964. Kennedy also established the Peace Corps and promised to land an American on the Moon and return him safely to Earth, thereby intensifying the Space Race with the Soviet Union.

Kennedy was assassinated on November 22, 1963, while visiting Dallas, Texas. The Warren Commission concluded that Lee Harvey Oswald acted alone in assassinating Kennedy, but the assassination gave rise to a wide array of conspiracy theories. Kennedy was the first Roman Catholic elected president, as well as the youngest candidate ever to win a U.S. presidential election. Historians and political scientists tend to rank Kennedy as an above-average president.

== 1960 election ==
Kennedy, who represented Massachusetts in the United States Senate from 1953 to 1960, had finished second on the vice presidential ballot of the 1956 Democratic National Convention. After Republican President Dwight D. Eisenhower was reelected over Adlai Stevenson in the 1956 presidential election, Kennedy began to prepare a bid for the presidency in the 1960 election. In January 1960, Kennedy formally announced his candidacy in that year's presidential election. Senator Hubert Humphrey of Minnesota emerged as Kennedy's primary challenger in the 1960 Democratic primaries, but Kennedy's victory in the heavily-Protestant state of West Virginia prompted Humphrey's withdrawal from the race. At the 1960 Democratic National Convention, Kennedy fended off challenges from Stevenson and Senator Lyndon B. Johnson of Texas to win the presidential nomination on the first ballot of the convention. Kennedy chose Johnson to be his vice-presidential running mate, despite opposition from many liberal delegates and Kennedy's own staff, including his brother Robert F. Kennedy. Kennedy believed that Johnson's presence on the ticket would appeal to Southern voters, and he thought that Johnson could serve as a valuable liaison to the Senate.

Incumbent Vice President Richard Nixon easily won the 1960 Republican Party presidential primaries. Nixon chose Henry Cabot Lodge Jr., the chief U.S. delegate to the United Nations, as his running mate. Both presidential nominees traveled extensively during the course of the campaign. Not wanting to concede any state as "unwinnable," Nixon undertook a fifty-state strategy, while Kennedy focused the states with the most electoral votes. Major issues in the campaign included the economy, Kennedy's Catholicism, Cuba, and whether the Soviet space and missile programs had surpassed those of the U.S.

1960 Electoral College vote results

On November 8, 1960, Kennedy defeated Nixon in one of the closest presidential elections in American history. Kennedy won the popular vote by a narrow margin of 120,000 votes out of a record 68.8 million ballots cast. He won the electoral vote by a wider margin, receiving 303 votes to Nixon's 219. 14 unpledged electors (Note: Southern Democrats in several states who were opposed to the national Democratic Party's support for civil rights and voting rights for African Americans living in the South, attempted to block Kennedy's election by denying him the necessary number of electoral votes (269 of 537) for victory.) from two states—Alabama and Mississippi—voted for Senator Harry F. Byrd of Virginia, as did one faithless elector (Note: Henry D. Irwin, who had been pledged to vote for Nixon.) in Oklahoma. In the concurrent congressional elections, Democrats retained wide majorities in both the House of Representatives and the Senate. Nevertheless, 29 House Democrats were displaced, each of whom was a Kennedy progressive. According to one study, "For the first time in a century a party taking over the Presidency failed to gain in the Congress." Kennedy was the first person born in the 20th century to be elected president, and, at age 43, the youngest person elected to the office. (Note: Theodore Roosevelt was nine months younger when he first assumed the presidency on September 14, 1901, but he was not elected to the office until 1904, when he was 46.) He was also the first Roman Catholic elected to the presidency.

== Transition ==
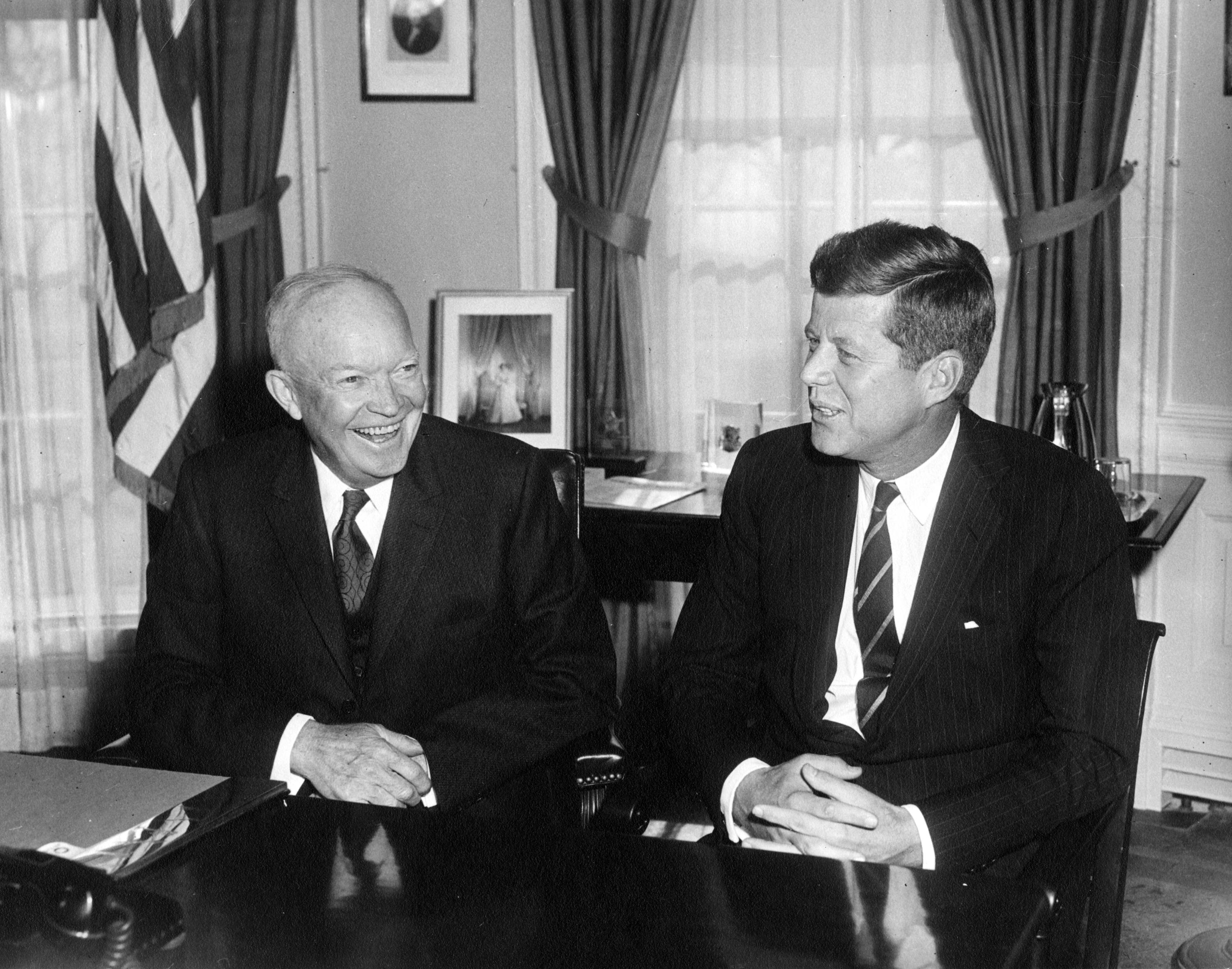
Outgoing president Dwight D. Eisenhower and President-elect John F. Kennedy at the White House on December 6, 1960

Kennedy placed Clark Clifford in charge of his transition effort.

== Inauguration ==
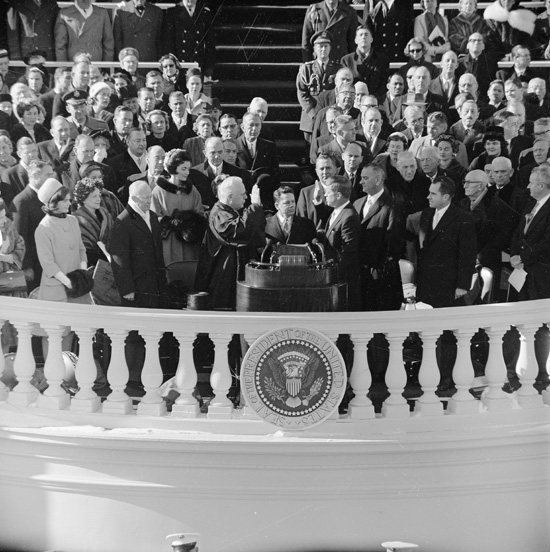
Chief Justice Earl Warren administers the presidential oath of office to John F. Kennedy at the Capitol, January 20, 1961.

Kennedy was inaugurated as the nation's 35th president on January 20, 1961, on the East Portico of the United States Capitol. Chief Justice Earl Warren administered the oath of office. As of 2025 it was the last inauguration with a formal dress code. Despite his general aversion to hats, President Kennedy wore the traditional black top hat then customary for the occasion.

In his inaugural address, Kennedy spoke of the need for all Americans to be active citizens, famously saying: "Ask not what your country can do for you; ask what you can do for your country." He also invited the nations of the world to join to fight what he called the "common enemies of man: tyranny, poverty, disease, and war itself." To these admonitions he added:

All this will not be finished in the first one hundred days. Nor will it be finished in the first one thousand days, nor in the life of this Administration, nor even perhaps in our lifetime on this planet. But let us begin." In closing, he expanded on his desire for greater internationalism: "Finally, whether you are citizens of America or citizens of the world, ask of us here the same high standards of strength and sacrifice which we ask of you.

The address reflected Kennedy's confidence that his administration would chart a historically significant course in both domestic policy and foreign affairs. The contrast between this optimistic vision and the pressures of managing daily political realities at home and abroad would be one of the main tensions running through the early years of his administration.

== Administration ==
Kennedy cabinet
Office	Name	Term
President	John F. Kennedy	1961–1963
Vice President	Lyndon B. Johnson	1961–1963
Secretary of State	Dean Rusk	1961–1963
Secretary of the Treasury	C. Douglas Dillon	1961–1963
Secretary of Defense	Robert McNamara	1961–1963
Attorney General	Robert F. Kennedy	1961–1963
Postmaster General	J. Edward Day	1961–1963
John A. Gronouski	1963
Secretary of the Interior	Stewart Udall	1961–1963
Secretary of Agriculture	Orville Freeman	1961–1963
Secretary of Commerce	Luther H. Hodges	1961–1963
Secretary of Labor	Arthur Goldberg	1961–1962
W. Willard Wirtz	1962–1963
Secretary of Health, Education, and Welfare	Abraham Ribicoff	1961–1962
Anthony J. Celebrezze	1962–1963
Ambassador to the United Nations	Adlai Stevenson II	1961–1963

Kennedy spent the eight weeks following his election choosing his cabinet, staff and top officials. He retained J. Edgar Hoover as Director of the Federal Bureau of Investigation and Allen Dulles as Director of Central Intelligence. C. Douglas Dillon, a business-oriented Republican who had served as Eisenhower's Undersecretary of State, was selected as Secretary of the Treasury. Kennedy balanced the appointment of the relatively conservative Dillon by selecting liberal Democrats to hold two other important economic advisory posts; David E. Bell became the Director of the Bureau of the Budget, while Walter Heller served as the Chairman of the Council of Economic Advisers.

Robert McNamara, who was well known as one of Ford Motor Company's "Whiz Kids", was appointed Secretary of Defense. Rejecting liberal pressure to choose Stevenson as Secretary of State, Kennedy instead turned to Dean Rusk, a restrained former Truman official, to lead the Department of State. Stevenson accepted a non-policy role as the ambassador to the United Nations. In spite of concerns over nepotism, Kennedy's father insisted that Robert F. Kennedy become Attorney General, and the younger Kennedy became the "assistant president" who advised on all major issues. McNamara and Dillon also emerged as important advisers from the cabinet.

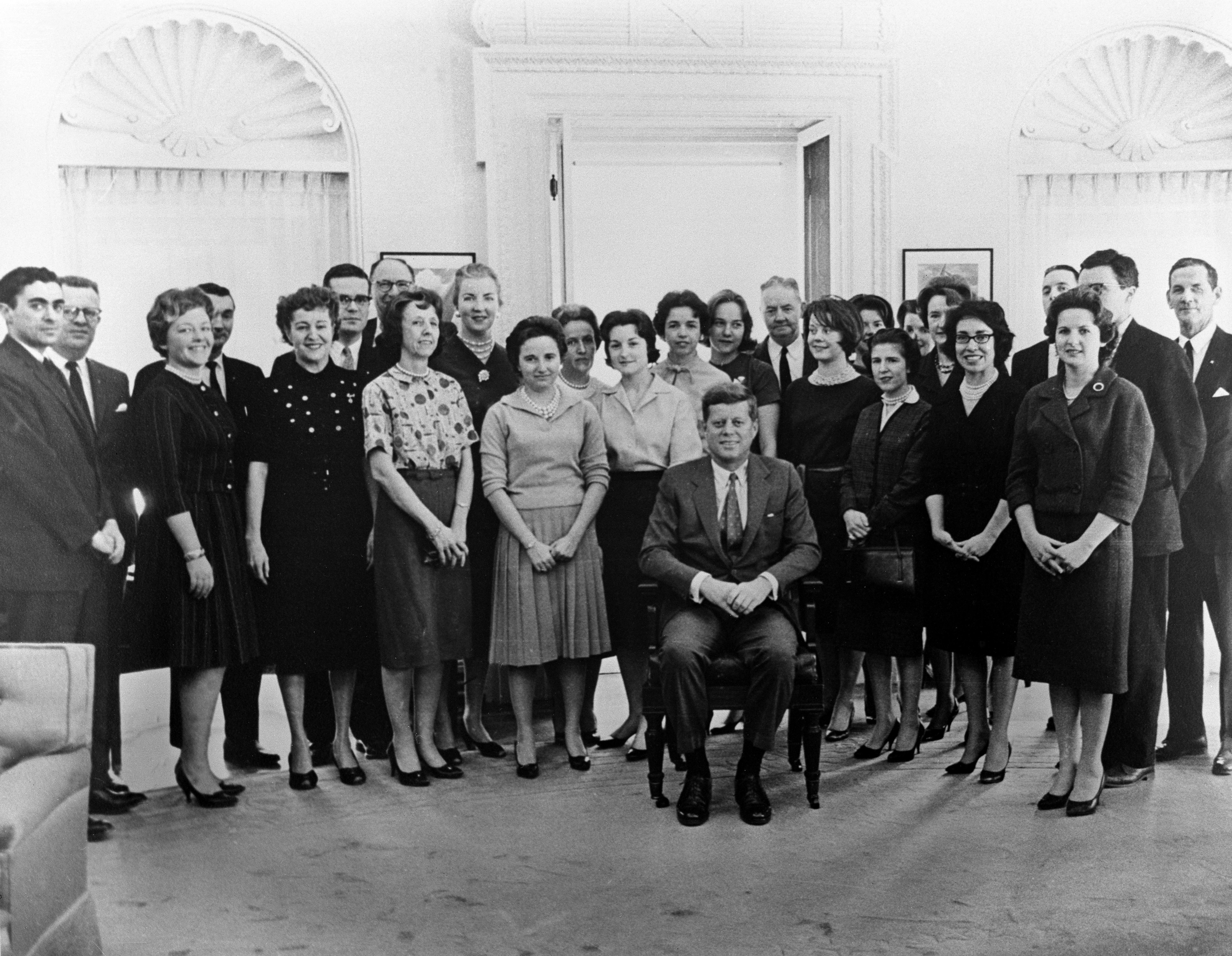
President John F. Kennedy (seated) with members of his White House staff

Kennedy scrapped the decision-making structure of Eisenhower, preferring an organizational structure of a wheel with all the spokes leading to the president; he was ready and willing to make the increased number of quick decisions required in such an environment. Though the cabinet remained an important body, Kennedy generally relied more on his staffers within the Executive Office of the President. Unlike Eisenhower, Kennedy did not have a chief of staff, but instead relied on a small number of senior aides, including appointments secretary Kenneth O'Donnell. National Security Advisor McGeorge Bundy was the most important adviser on foreign policy, eclipsing Secretary of State Rusk. Ted Sorensen was a key advisor on domestic issues who also wrote many of Kennedy's speeches. Other important advisers and staffers included Larry O'Brien, Arthur M. Schlesinger Jr., press secretary Pierre Salinger, General Maxwell D. Taylor, and W. Averell Harriman. Kennedy maintained cordial relations with Vice President Johnson, who was involved in issues like civil rights and space policy, but Johnson did not emerge as an especially influential vice president.

William Willard Wirtz Jr. was the last surviving member of Kennedy's cabinet, and died on April 24, 2010.

== Judicial appointments ==
Kennedy made two appointments to the United States Supreme Court. After the resignation of Charles Evans Whittaker in early 1962, President Kennedy assigned Attorney General Kennedy to conduct a search of potential successors, and the attorney general compiled a list consisting of Deputy Attorney General Byron White, Secretary of Labor Arthur Goldberg, federal appellate judge William H. Hastie, legal professor Paul A. Freund, and two state supreme court justices. Kennedy narrowed his choice down to Goldberg and White, and he ultimately chose the latter, who was quickly confirmed by the Senate. A second vacancy arose later in 1962 due to the retirement of Felix Frankfurter. Kennedy quickly appointed Goldberg, who easily won confirmation by the Senate. Goldberg resigned from the court in 1965 to accept appointment as ambassador to the United Nations, but White remained on the court until 1993, often serving as a key swing vote between liberal and conservative justices.

The president handled Supreme Court appointments. Other judges were selected by Attorney General Robert Kennedy. Including new federal judgeships created in 1961, 130 individuals were appointed to the federal courts. Among them was Thurgood Marshall, who later joined the Supreme Court. Ivy League undergraduate colleges were attended by 9% of the appointees; 19% attended Ivy League law schools. In terms of religion, 61% were Catholics, 38% were Protestant, and 11% were Jewish. Almost all (91%) were Democrats, but few had extensive experience in electoral politics.

== Foreign affairs ==
=== Peace Corps ===
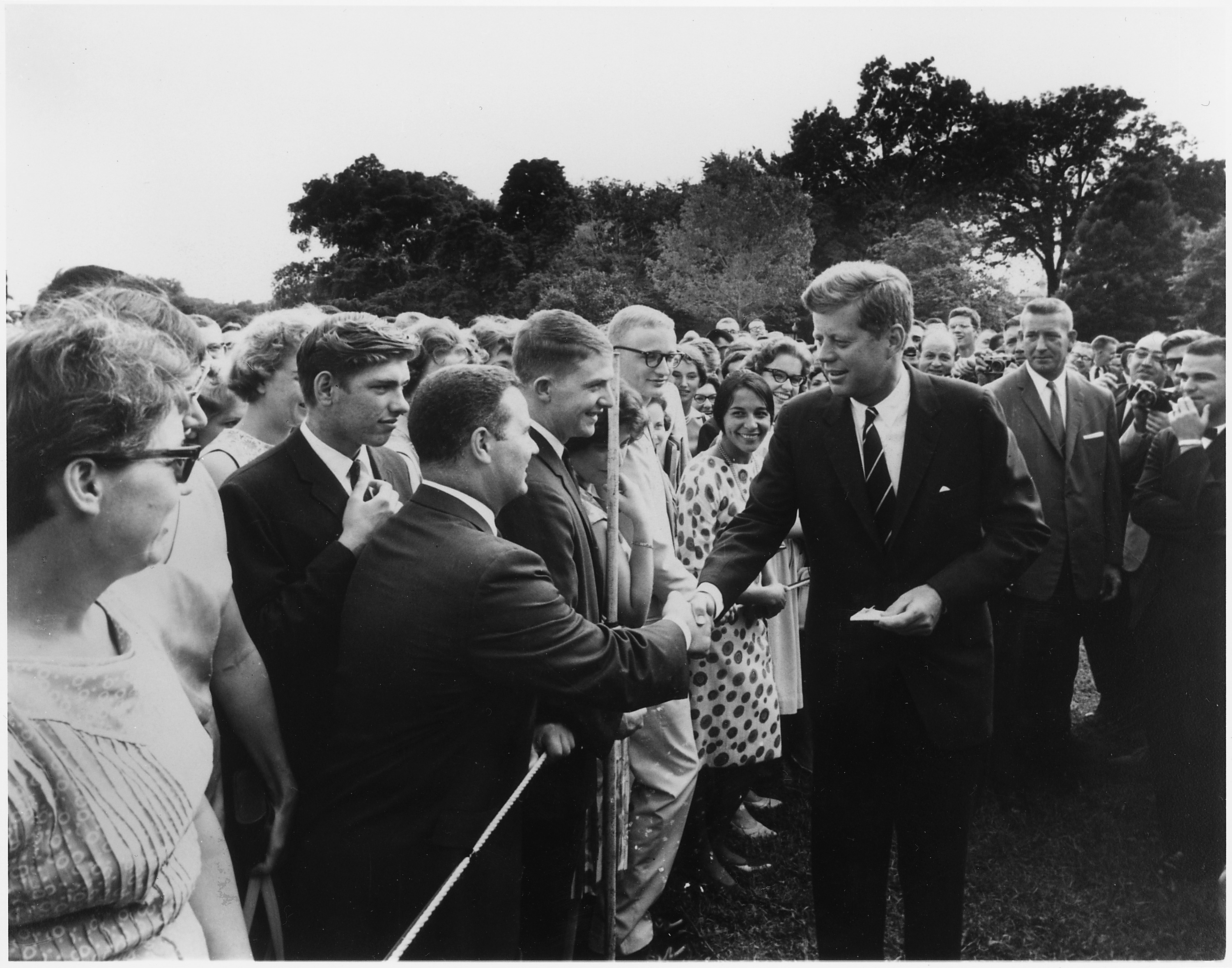
Kennedy greets Peace Corps volunteers on August 28, 1961

Establishment of the Peace Corps
John F. Kennedy's announcement of the establishment of the Peace Corps

An agency to enable Americans to volunteer in developing countries appealed to Kennedy because it fit in with his campaign themes of self-sacrifice and volunteerism, while also providing a way to redefine American relations with the Third World. His use of war rhetoric for peaceful ends made his appeal for the new idea compelling to public opinion.

On March 1, 1961, Kennedy signed Executive Order 10924 that officially started the Peace Corps. He appointed his brother-in-law, Sargent Shriver, to serve the agency's first director. Due in large part to Shriver's effective lobbying efforts, Congress approved the permanent establishment of the Peace Corps program on September 22, 1961. Tanganyika (present-day Tanzania) and Ghana were the first countries to participate in the program. Kennedy took great pride in the Peace Corps, and he ensured that it remained free of CIA influence, but he largely left its administration to Shriver. Kennedy also saw the program as a means of countering the stereotype of the "Ugly American" and "Yankee imperialism," especially in the emerging nations of post-colonial Africa and Asia. In the first twenty-five years, more than 100,000 Americans served in 44 countries as part of the program. Most Peace Corps volunteers taught English in schools, but many became involved in activities like construction and food delivery.

=== The Cold War and flexible response ===
Kennedy's foreign policy was dominated by American confrontations with the Soviet Union, manifested by proxy contests in the global state of tension known as the Cold War. Like his predecessors, Kennedy adopted the policy of containment, which sought to stop the spread of communism. President Eisenhower's New Look policy had emphasized the use of nuclear weapons to deter the threat of Soviet aggression. By 1960, however, public opinion was turning against New Look because it was not effective in stemming communist-inspired Third World revolutions. Fearful of the possibility of a global nuclear war, Kennedy implemented a new strategy known as flexible response. This strategy relied on conventional arms to achieve limited goals. As part of this policy, Kennedy expanded the United States special operations forces, elite military units that could fight unconventionally in various conflicts. Kennedy hoped that the flexible response strategy would allow the U.S. to counter Soviet influence without resorting to war. At the same time, he ordered a massive build-up of the nuclear arsenal to establish superiority over the Soviet Union.

In pursuing this military build-up, Kennedy shifted away from Eisenhower's deep concern for budget deficits caused by military spending. In contrast to Eisenhower's warning about the perils of the military-industrial complex, Kennedy focused on rearmament. From 1961 to 1964 the number of nuclear weapons increased by 50 percent, as did the number of B-52 bombers to deliver them. The new ICBM force grew from 63 intercontinental ballistic missiles to 424. He authorized 23 new Polaris submarines, each of which carried 16 nuclear missiles. Meanwhile, he called on cities to prepare fallout shelters for nuclear war.

In January 1961, Soviet Premier Nikita Khrushchev declared his support for wars of national liberation. Kennedy interpreted this step as a direct threat to the "free world."

=== Decolonization and developing countries ===
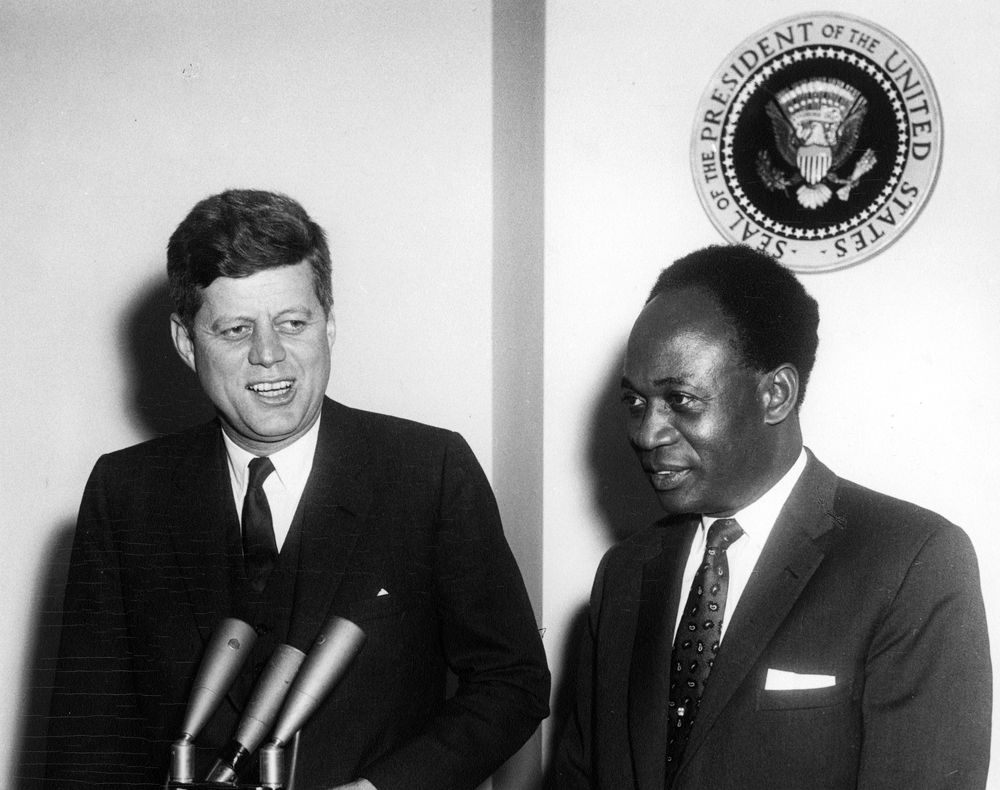
Kennedy with Kwame Nkrumah, the first president of an independent Ghana, March 1961

Between 1960 and 1963, twenty-four countries gained independence as the process of decolonization continued. Many of these nations sought to avoid close alignment with either the United States or the Soviet Union, and in 1961, the leaders of India, Yugoslavia, Indonesia, Egypt, and Ghana created the Non-Aligned Movement. Kennedy set out to woo the leaders and people of the Third World, expanding economic aid and appointing knowledgeable ambassadors. His administration established the Food for Peace program and the Peace Corps to provide aid to developing countries in various ways. The Food for Peace program became a central element in American foreign policy, and eventually helped many countries to develop their economies and become commercial import customers.

During his presidency, Kennedy sought closer relations with Indian Prime Minister Jawaharlal Nehru through increased economic aid and a tilt away from Pakistan, but made little progress in bringing India closer to the United States. Kennedy hoped to minimize Soviet influence in Egypt through good relations with President Gamal Abdel Nasser, but Nasser's hostility towards Saudi Arabia and Jordan closed off the possibility of closer relations. In Southeast Asia, Kennedy helped mediate the West New Guinea dispute, convincing Indonesia and the Netherlands to agree to a plebiscite to determine the status of Dutch New Guinea.

==== Congo Crisis ====
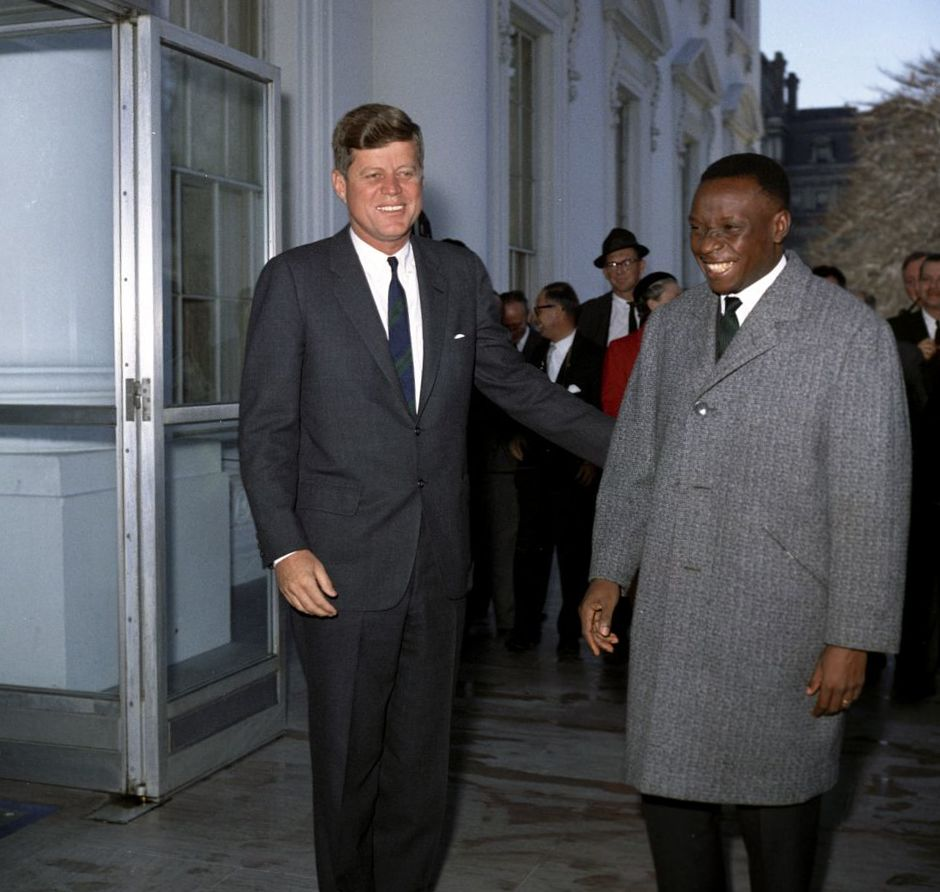
President Kennedy with Congolese Prime Minister Cyrille Adoula in 1962

Having chaired a subcommittee on Africa of the U.S. Senate's Foreign Relations Committee, Kennedy had developed a special interest in Africa. During the election campaign, Kennedy managed to mention Africa nearly 500 times, often attacking the Eisenhower administration for losing ground on that continent, and stressed that the U.S. should be on the side of anti-colonialism and self-determination.

Kennedy considered the Congo Crisis to be one of the most important foreign policy issues facing his presidency. The Republic of the Congo gained independence from Belgian colonial rule on June 30, 1960, and was almost immediately torn apart by what President Kennedy described as "civil strife, political unrest and public disorder." Former Prime Minister Patrice Lumumba had been murdered early in 1961 despite the presence of a United Nations peacekeeping force (supported by Kennedy); Moïse Tshombe, leader of the State of Katanga, declared its independence from the Congo and the Soviet Union responded by sending weapons and technicians to underwrite their struggle. The crisis, exacerbated by Cold War tensions, continued well into the 1960s.

Kennedy and his incoming advisers were apparently unaware of the CIA's involvement in Lumumba's death. In fact, Kennedy wasn't even aware Lumumba had been killed until February 13, 1961. On October 2, 1962, Kennedy signed United Nations bond issue bill to ensure U.S. assistance in financing United Nations peacekeeping operations in the Congo and elsewhere. Around this time, the Kennedy administration was making private attempts to convince Tshombe to reunite the breakaway Katanga that he led with the Congo, in advance of UN intervention.

=== Cuba and the Soviet Union ===
==== Bay of Pigs Invasion ====
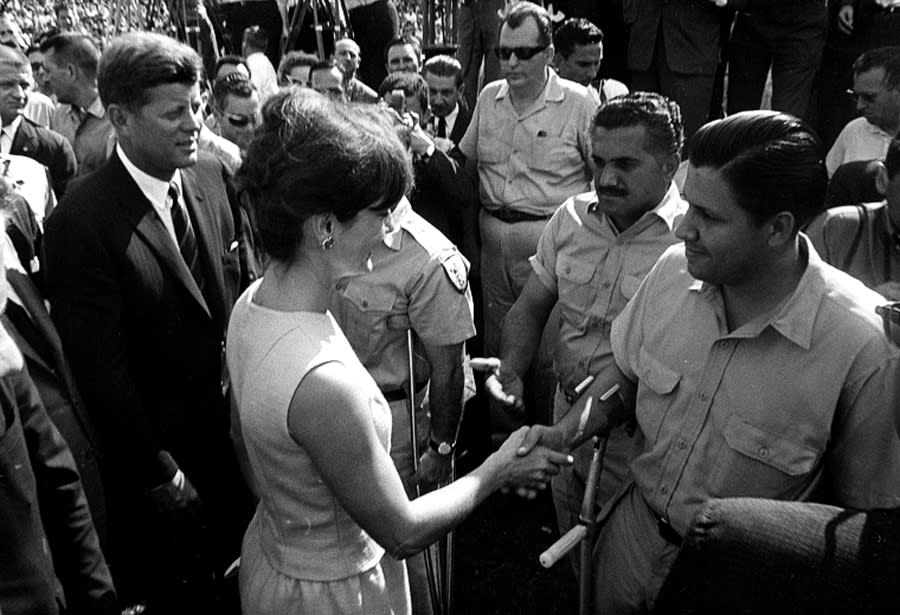
President Kennedy and Jacqueline Kennedy greet members of the 2506 Cuban Invasion Brigade at Miami's Orange Bowl. c. December 29, 1962

Fulgencio Batista, a Cuban dictator friendly towards the United States, had been forced out office in 1959 by the Cuban Revolution. Many in the United States, including Kennedy himself, had initially hoped that Batista's successor, Fidel Castro would preside over democratic reforms. Dashing those hopes, by the end of 1960 Castro had embraced Marxism, confiscated American property, and accepted Soviet aid. The Eisenhower administration had created a plan to overthrow Castro's regime though an invasion of Cuba by a counter-revolutionary insurgency composed of U.S.-trained, anti-Castro Cuban exiles led by CIA paramilitary officers. Kennedy had campaigned on a hardline stance against Castro, and when presented with the plan that had been developed under the Eisenhower administration, he enthusiastically adopted it regardless of the risk of inflaming tensions with the Soviet Union. Some advisors, including Schlesinger, Under Secretary of State Chester Bowles, and former Secretary of State Dean Acheson, opposed the operation, but Bundy and McNamara both favored it, as did the Joint Chiefs of Staff, despite serious reservations. Kennedy approved the final invasion plan on April 4, 1961.

On April 15, 1961, eight CIA-supplied B-26 bombers left Nicaragua to bomb Cuban airfields. The bombers missed many of their targets and left most of Castro's air force intact. On April 17, the 1,500 U.S.-trained Cuban exile invasion force, known as Brigade 2506, landed on the beach at Playa Girón in the Bay of Pigs and immediately came under heavy fire. The goal was to spark a widespread popular uprising against Castro, but no such uprising occurred. Although the Eisenhower administration plan had called for an American airstrike to hold back the Cuban counterattack until the invaders were established, Kennedy rejected the strike because it would emphasize the American sponsorship of the invasion. CIA director Allen Dulles later stated that they thought the president would authorize any action required for success once the troops were on the ground. The invading force was defeated within two days by the Cuban Revolutionary Armed Forces; 114 were killed and over 1,100 were taken prisoner. Kennedy was forced to negotiate for the release of the 1,189 survivors. After twenty months, Cuba released the captured exiles in exchange for a ransom of $53 million worth of food and medicine.

Despite the lack of direct U.S. military involvement, the Soviet Union, Cuba, and the international community all recognized that the U.S. had backed the invasion. Kennedy focused primarily on the political repercussions of the plan rather than military considerations. In the aftermath, he took full responsibility for the failure, saying: "We got a big kick in the leg and we deserved it. But maybe we'll learn something from it." Kennedy's approval ratings climbed afterwards, helped in part by the vocal support given to him by Nixon and Eisenhower. Outside the United States, however, the operation undermined Kennedy's reputation as a world leader, and raised tensions with the Soviet Union. A secret review conducted by Lyman Kirkpatrick of the CIA concluded that the failure of the invasion resulted less from a decision against airstrikes and had more to do with the fact that Cuba had a much larger defending force and that the operation suffered from "poor planning, organization, staffing and management". The Kennedy administration banned all Cuban imports and convinced the Organization of American States to expel Cuba. Kennedy dismissed Dulles as director of the CIA and increasingly relied on close advisers like Sorensen, Bundy, and Robert Kennedy as opposed to the Joint Chiefs of Staff, the CIA, and the State Department.

==== Operation Mongoose ====
In late-1961, the White House formed the Special Group (Augmented), headed by Robert Kennedy and including Edward Lansdale, Secretary Robert McNamara, and others. The group's objective—to overthrow Castro via espionage, sabotage, and other covert tactics—was never pursued. In November 1961, he authorized Operation Mongoose (also known as the Cuban Project). In March 1962, Kennedy rejected Operation Northwoods, proposals for false flag attacks against American military and civilian targets, and blaming them on the Cuban government in order to gain approval for a war against Cuba. However, the administration continued to plan for an invasion of Cuba in the summer of 1962.

==== Vienna Summit ====
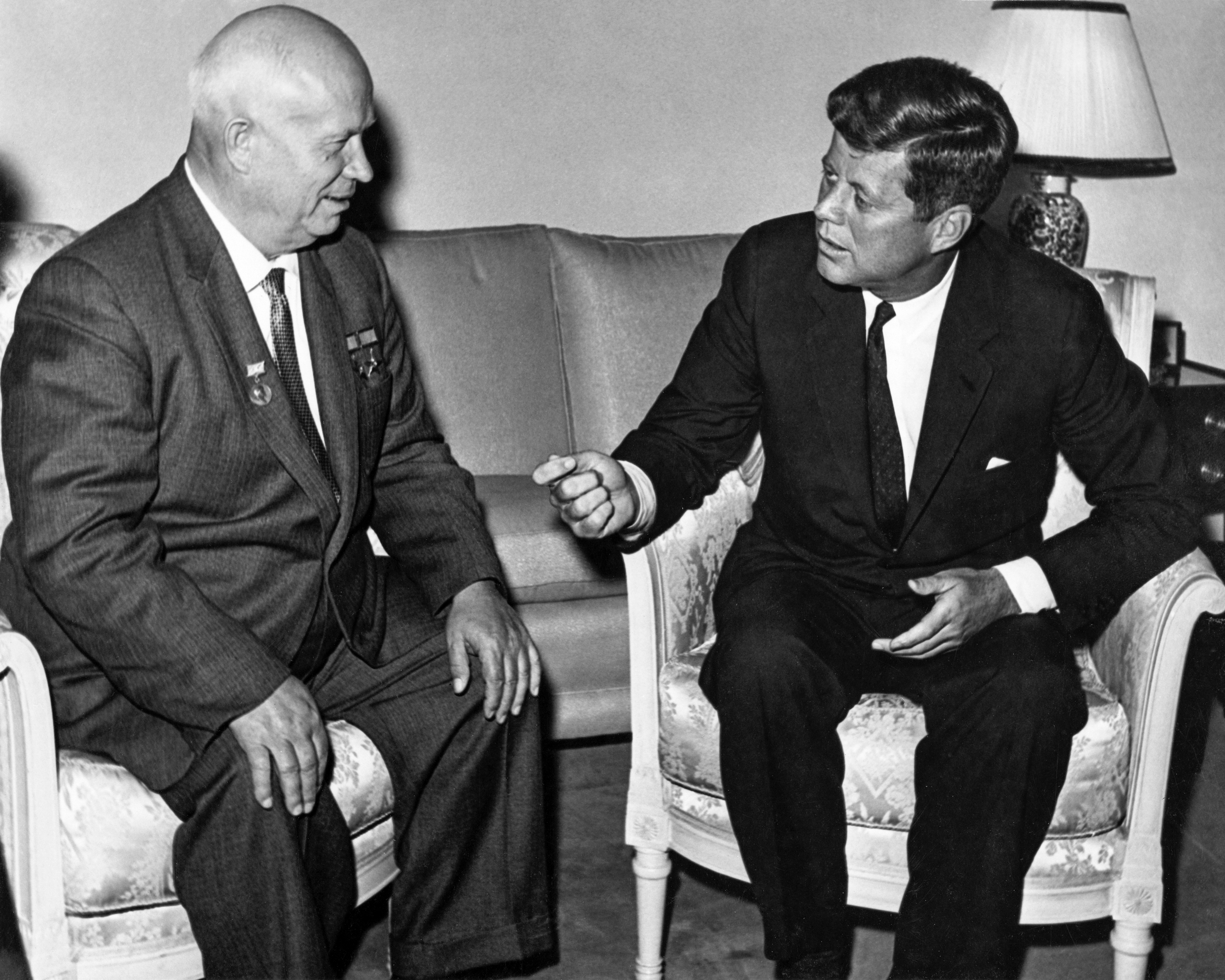
Kennedy meeting with Soviet Premier Nikita Khrushchev in Vienna in June 1961

U.S. Information Agency motion picture on the 1961 Vienna Summit

In the aftermath of the Bay of Pigs invasion, Kennedy announced that he would meet with Soviet Premier Nikita Khrushchev at the June 1961 Vienna summit. The summit would cover several topics, but both leaders knew that the most contentious issue would be that of Berlin, which had been divided into two cities with the start of the Cold War. The enclave of West Berlin lay within Soviet-allied East Germany, but was supported by the U.S. and other Western powers. The Soviets wanted to reunify Berlin under the control of East Germany, partly due to the large number of East Germans who had fled to West Berlin. Khrushchev had clashed with Eisenhower over the issue but had tabled it after the 1960 U-2 incident; with the inauguration of a new U.S. president, Khrushchev was once again determined to bring the status of West Berlin to the fore. Kennedy's handling of the Bay of Pigs crisis convinced him that Kennedy would wither under pressure. Kennedy, meanwhile, wanted to meet with Khrushchev as soon as possible in order to reduce tensions and minimize the risk of nuclear war. Prior to the summit, Harriman advised Kennedy, "[Khrushchev's] style will be to attack you and see if he can get away with it. Laugh about it, don't get into a fight. Rise above it. Have some fun."

On the way to the summit, Kennedy stopped in Paris to meet French President Charles de Gaulle, who advised him to ignore Khrushchev's abrasive style. The French president feared the United States' presumed influence in Europe. Nevertheless, de Gaulle was quite impressed with the young president and his family. Kennedy picked up on this in his speech in Paris, saying that he would be remembered as "the man who accompanied Jackie Kennedy to Paris."

On June 4, 1961, the president met with Khrushchev in Vienna, where he made it clear that any treaty between East Berlin and the Soviet Union that interfered with U.S. access rights in West Berlin would be regarded as an act of war. The two leaders also discussed the situation in Laos, the Congo Crisis, China's fledgling nuclear program, a potential nuclear test ban treaty, and other issues. Shortly after Kennedy returned home, the Soviet Union announced its intention to sign a treaty with East Berlin that would threaten Western access to West Berlin. Kennedy, depressed and angry, assumed that his only option was to prepare the country for nuclear war, which he personally thought had a one-in-five chance of occurring.

==== Berlin ====
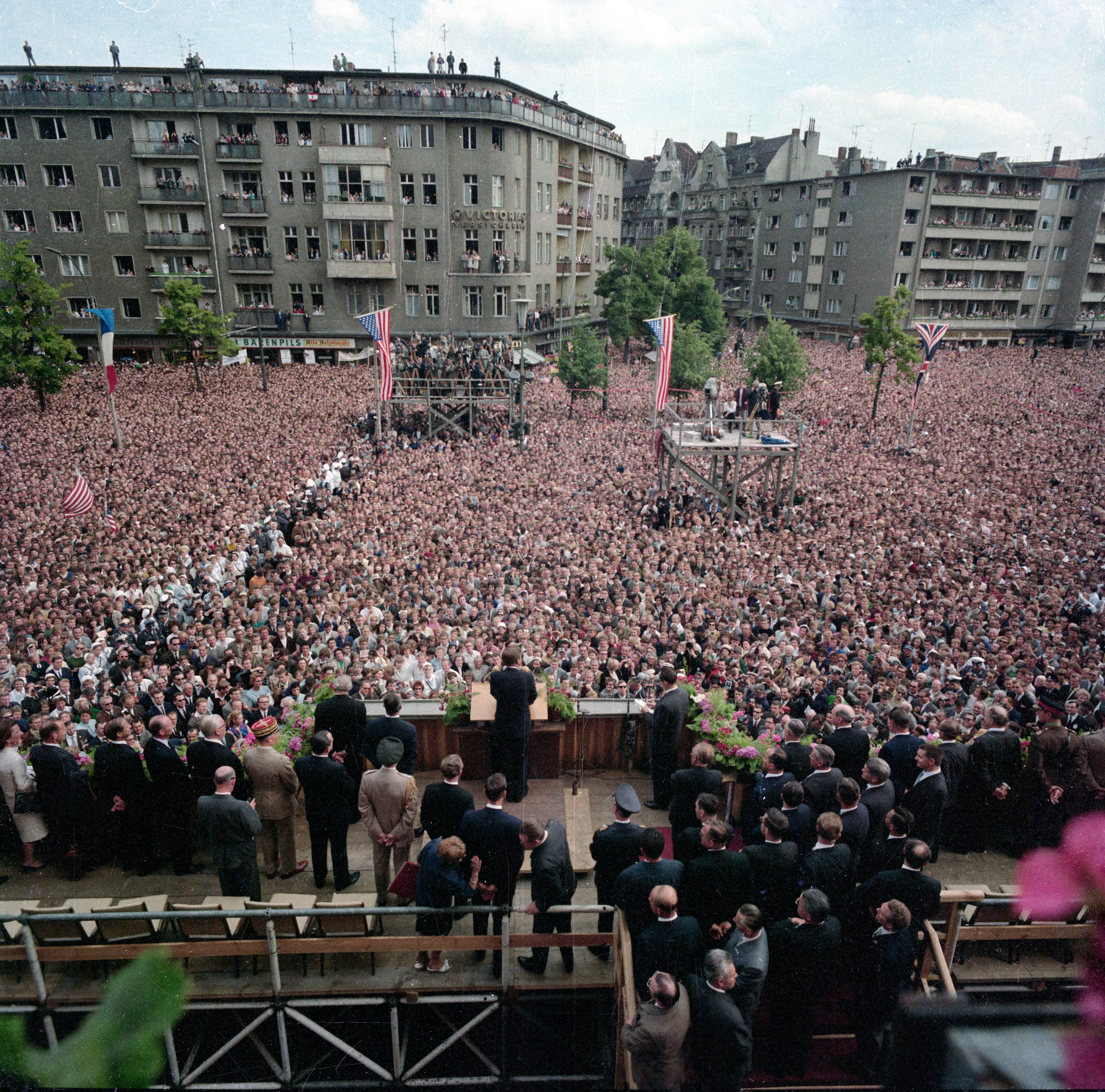
Kennedy delivering his June 26, 1963, speech West Berlin, known as the Ich bin ein Berliner speech

President Kennedy called Berlin "the great testing place of Western courage and will." In the weeks immediately after the Vienna summit, more than 20,000 people fled from East Berlin to the western sector in reaction to statements from the Soviet Union. Kennedy began intensive meetings on the Berlin issue, where Dean Acheson took the lead in recommending a military buildup alongside NATO allies. In a July 1961 speech, Kennedy announced his decision to add $3.25 billion to the defense budget, along with over 200,000 additional troops, stating that an attack on West Berlin would be taken as an attack on the U.S. On August 13, 1961, the Soviet Union and East Berlin began blocking further passage of East Berliners into West Berlin and erected barbed wire fences across the city, which were quickly upgraded to the Berlin Wall. Kennedy acquiesced to the wall, though he sent Vice President Johnson to West Berlin to reaffirm U.S. commitment to the enclave's defense. In the following months, in a sign of rising Cold War tensions, both the U.S. and the Soviet Union ended a moratorium on nuclear weapon testing. A brief stand-off between U.S. and Soviet tanks occurred at Checkpoint Charlie in October following a dispute over free movement of Allied personnel. The crisis was defused largely through a backchannel communication the Kennedy administration had set up with Soviet spy Georgi Bolshakov.

In 1963, French President Charles de Gaulle was trying to build a Franco-West German counterweight to the American and Soviet spheres of influence. To Kennedy's eyes, this Franco-German cooperation seemed directed against NATO's influence in Europe. To reinforce the U.S. alliance with West Germany, Kennedy travelled to West Germany in June 1963. On June 26, Kennedy toured West Berlin, culminating in his famous "Ich bin ein Berliner" ("I am a Berliner") speech in front of hundreds of thousands of enthusiastic Berliners. Kennedy used the construction of the Berlin Wall as an example of the failures of communism: "Freedom has many difficulties, and democracy is not perfect. But we have never had to put a wall up to keep our people in, to prevent them from leaving us." In remarks to his aides on the Berlin Wall, Kennedy noted that "it's not a very nice solution, but a wall is a hell of a lot better than a war."

==== Cuban Missile Crisis ====
Universal Newsreel about the Cuban Missile Crisis

In the aftermath of the Bay of Pigs invasion, Cuban and Soviet leaders feared that the United States was planning another invasion of Cuba, and Khrushchev increased economic and military assistance to the island. The Soviet Union planned to allocate in Cuba 49 medium-range ballistic missiles, 32 intermediate-range ballistic missiles, 49 light Il-28 bombers and about 100 tactical nuclear weapons. The Kennedy administration viewed the growing Cuba-Soviet alliance with alarm, fearing that it could eventually pose a threat to the United States. Kennedy did not believe that the Soviet Union would risk placing nuclear weapons in Cuba, but he dispatched CIA U-2 spy planes to determine the extent of the Soviet military build-up. On October 14, 1962, the spy planes took photographs of intermediate-range ballistic missile sites being built in Cuba by the Soviets. The photos were shown to Kennedy on October 16, and a consensus was reached that the missiles were offensive in nature.

Following the Vienna Summit, Khrushchev came to believe that Kennedy would not respond effectively to provocations. He saw the deployment of the missiles in Cuba as a way to close the "missile gap" and provide for the defense of Cuba. By late 1962, both the United States and the Soviet Union possessed intercontinental ballistic missiles (ICBMs) capable of delivering nuclear payloads, but the U.S. maintained well over 100 ICBMs, as well as over 100 submarine-launched ballistic missile (SLBMs). By contrast, the Soviet Union did not possess SLBMs, and had less than 25 ICBMs. The placement of missiles in Cuba thus threatened to significantly enhance the Soviet Union's first strike capability and even the nuclear imbalance. Kennedy himself did not believe that the deployment of missiles to Cuba fundamentally altered the strategic balance of the nuclear forces; more significant for him was the political and psychological implications of allowing the Soviet Union to maintain nuclear weapons in Cuba.

Address on the Buildup of Arms in Cuba
Kennedy addressing the nation on October 22, 1962, about the buildup of arms on Cuba

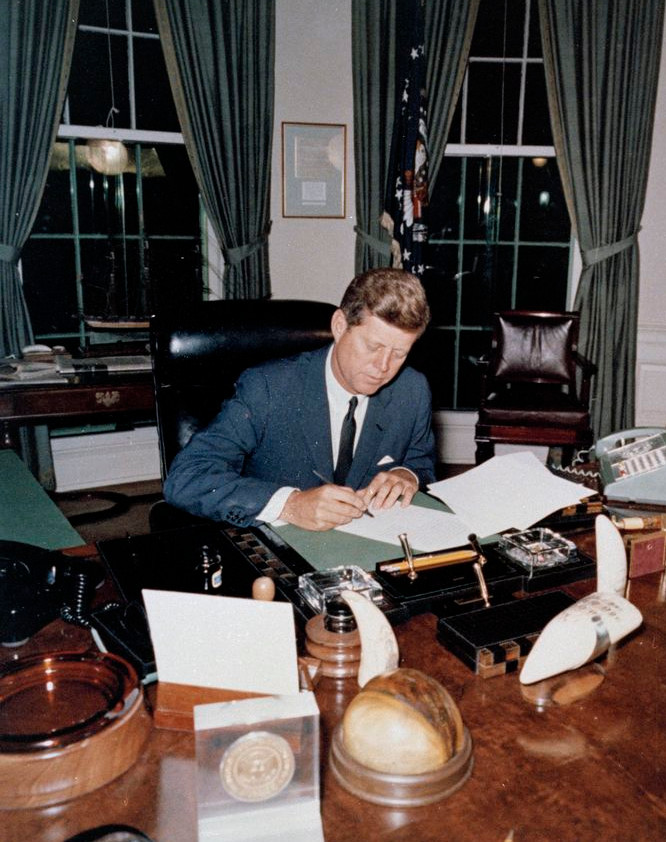
Kennedy signs the Proclamation for Interdiction of the Delivery of Offensive Weapons to Cuba in the Oval Office, October 23, 1962.

Kennedy faced a dilemma: if the U.S. attacked the sites, it might lead to nuclear war with the U.S.S.R., but if the U.S. did nothing, it would be faced with the increased threat from close-range nuclear weapons (positioned approximately 90 mi (140 km) away from the Florida coast). The U.S. would also appear to the world as less committed to the defense of the Western Hemisphere. On a personal level, Kennedy needed to show resolve in reaction to Khrushchev, especially after the Vienna summit. To deal with the crisis, he formed an ad hoc body of key advisers, later known as EXCOMM, that met secretly between October 16 and 28. The members of EXCOMM agreed that the missiles must be removed from Cuba, but differed as to the best method. Some favored an airstrike, possibly followed by an invasion of Cuba, but Robert Kennedy and others argued that a surprise airstrike would be immoral and would invite Soviet reprisals. The other major option that emerged was a naval blockade, designed to prevent further arms shipments to Cuba. Though he had initially favored an immediate air strike, the president quickly came to favor the naval blockade the first method of response, while retaining the option of an airstrike at a later date. EXCOMM voted 11-to-6 in favor of the naval blockade, which was also supported by British ambassador David Ormsby-Gore and Eisenhower, both of whom were consulted privately. On October 22, after privately informing the cabinet and leading members of Congress about the situation, Kennedy announced on national television that the U.S. had discovered evidence of the Soviet deployment of missiles to Cuba. He called for the immediate withdrawal of the missiles, as well as the convening of the United Nations Security Council and the Organization of American States (OAS). Finally, he announced that the U.S. would begin a naval blockade of Cuba in order to intercept arms shipments.

On October 23, in a unanimous vote, the OAS approved a resolution that endorsed the blockade and called for the removal of the Soviet nuclear weapons from Cuba. That same day, Adlai Stevenson presented the U.S. case to the UN Security Council, though the Soviet Union's veto power precluded the possibility of passing a Security Council resolution. On the morning of October 24, over 150 U.S. ships were deployed to enforce the blockade against Cuba. Several Soviet ships approached the blockade line, but they stopped or reversed course to avoid the blockade. On October 25, Khrushchev offered to remove the missiles if the U.S. promised not to invade Cuba. The next day, he sent a second message in which he also demanded the removal of PGM-19 Jupiter missiles from Turkey. EXCOMM settled on what has been termed the "Trollope ploy;" the U.S. would respond to the Khrushchev's first message and ignore the second. Kennedy managed to preserve restraint when a Soviet missile unauthorizedly downed a U.S. Lockheed U-2 reconnaissance aircraft over Cuba, killing the pilot Rudolf Anderson. On October 27, Kennedy sent a letter to Khrushchev calling for the removal of the Cuban missiles in return for an end to the blockade and an American promise to refrain from invading Cuba. At the president's direction, Robert Kennedy privately informed Soviet Ambassador Anatoly Dobrynin that the U.S. would remove the Jupiter missiles from Turkey "within a short time after this crisis was over." Few members of EXCOMM expected Khrushchev to agree to the offer, but on October 28 Khrushchev publicly announced that he would withdraw the missiles from Cuba. Negotiations over the details of the withdrawal continued, but the U.S. ended the naval blockade on November 20, and most Soviet soldiers left Cuba by early 1963.

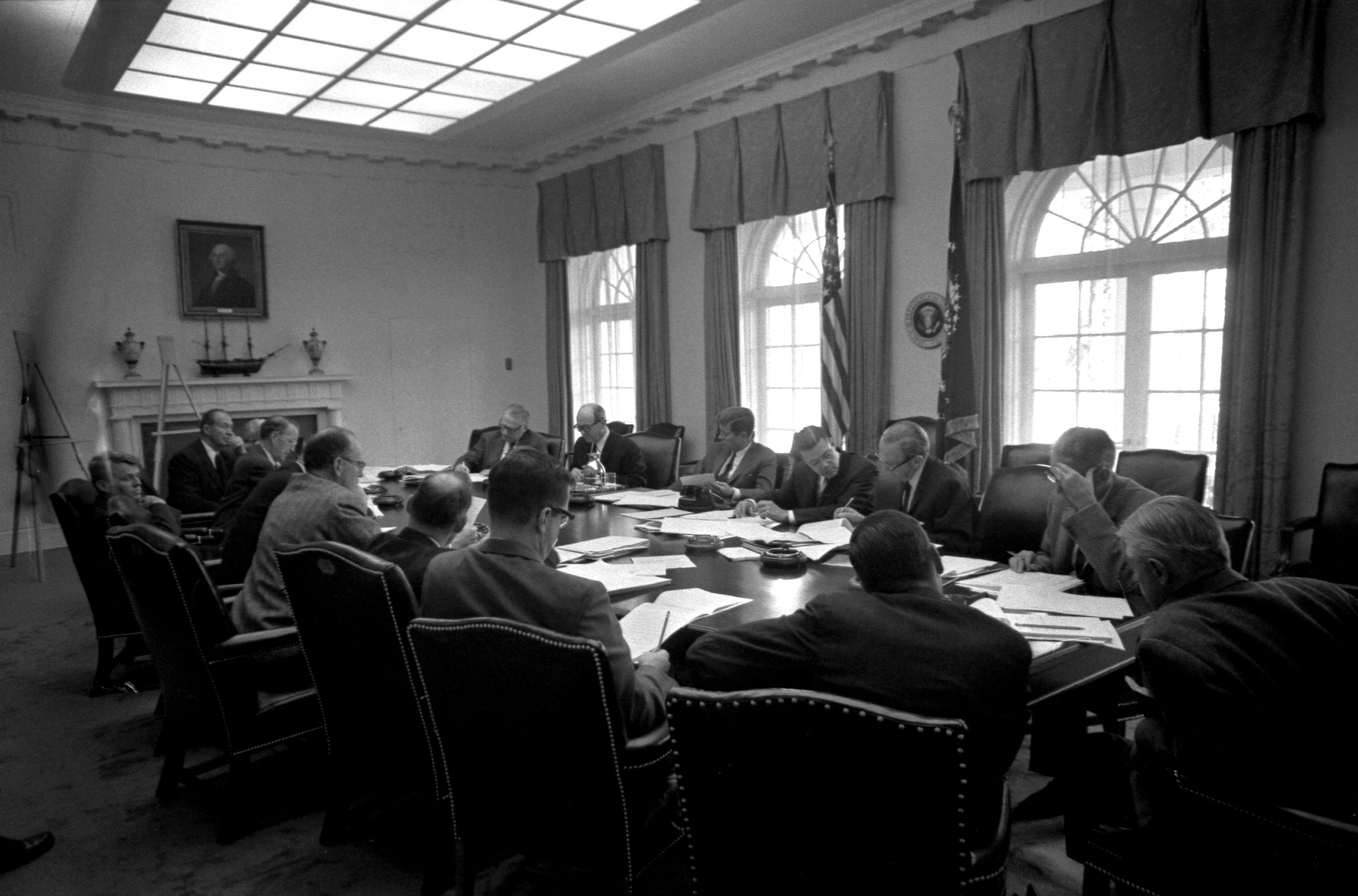
An EXCOMM meeting on October 29, 1962

The U.S. publicly promised never to invade Cuba and privately agreed to remove its missiles in Italy and Turkey; the missiles were by then obsolete and had been supplanted by submarines equipped with UGM-27 Polaris missiles. In the aftermath of the crisis, a Moscow–Washington hotline was established to ensure clear communications between the leaders of the two countries. The Cuban Missile Crisis brought the world closer to nuclear war than at any point before or since. In the end, "the humanity" of the two men prevailed. The crisis improved the image of American willpower and the president's credibility. Kennedy's approval rating increased from 66% to 77% immediately thereafter. Kennedy's handling of the Cuban Missile Crisis has received wide praise from many scholars, although some critics fault the Kennedy administration for precipitating the crisis with its efforts to remove Castro. Khrushchev, meanwhile, was widely mocked for his performance, and was removed from power in October 1964. According to Anatoly Dobrynin, the top Soviet leadership took the Cuban outcome as "a blow to its prestige bordering on humiliation."

==== Nuclear Test Ban Treaty ====
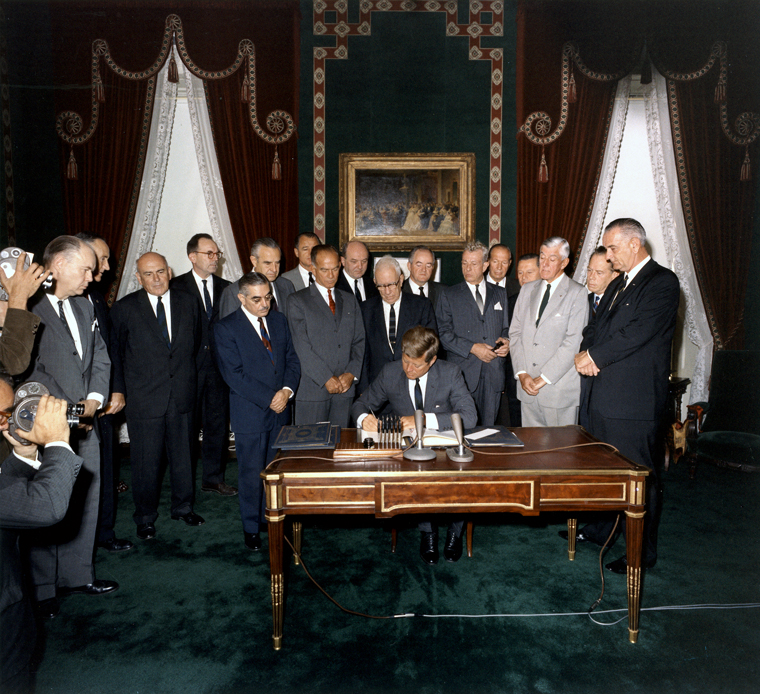
Kennedy signs the Partial Test Ban Treaty, a major milestone in early nuclear disarmament, on October 7, 1963.

Troubled by the long-term dangers of radioactive contamination and nuclear weapons proliferation, Kennedy and Khrushchev agreed to negotiate a nuclear test ban treaty, originally conceived in Adlai Stevenson's 1956 presidential campaign. In their Vienna summit meeting in June 1961, Khrushchev and Kennedy had reached an informal understanding against nuclear testing, but further negotiations were derailed by the resumption of nuclear testing. In his address to the United Nations on September 25, 1961, Kennedy challenged the Soviet Union "not to an arms race, but to a peace race." Unsuccessful in his efforts to reach a diplomatic agreement, Kennedy reluctantly announced the resumption of atmospheric testing on April 25, 1962. Soviet-American relations improved after the resolution of the Cuban Missile Crisis, and the powers resumed negotiations over a test ban treaty. Negotiations were facilitated by the Vatican and by the shuttle diplomacy of editor Norman Cousins.

World Peace Speech
Speech from American University by John F. Kennedy, June 10, 1963 (duration 26:47)

On June 10, 1963, Kennedy delivered a commencement address at the American University in Washington, D.C. Also known as "A Strategy of Peace", not only did Kennedy outline a plan to curb nuclear arms, but he also "laid out a hopeful, yet realistic route for world peace at a time when the U.S. and Soviet Union faced the potential for an escalating nuclear arms race." Kennedy also made two announcements: 1.) that the Soviets had expressed a desire to negotiate a nuclear test ban treaty, and 2.) that the U.S. had postponed planned atmospheric tests. "If we cannot end our differences," he said, "at least we can help make the world a safe place for diversity." The Soviet government broadcast a translation of the entire speech and allowed it to be reprinted in the controlled Soviet press.

The following month, Kennedy sent W. Averell Harriman to Moscow to negotiate a test-ban treaty with the Soviets. Each party sought a comprehensive test ban treaty, but a dispute over the number of on-site inspections allowed in each year prevented a total ban on testing. Ultimately, the United States, the United Kingdom, and the Soviet Union agreed to a limited treaty that prohibited atomic testing on the ground, in the atmosphere, or underwater, but not underground. The Limited Nuclear Test Ban treaty was signed in Moscow on August 5, 1963, by U.S. Secretary Dean Rusk, Soviet Foreign Minister Andrei Gromyko, and British Foreign Secretary Alec Douglas-Home. The U.S. Senate approved the treaty on September 23, 1963, by an 80–19 margin. Kennedy signed the ratified treaty on October 7, 1963. The treaty represented an important deescalation of Cold War tensions, but both countries continued to build their respective nuclear stockpiles. The U.S. and the Soviet Union also reached an agreement whereby the U.S. sold millions of bushels of wheat to the Soviet Union.

=== Southeast Asia ===
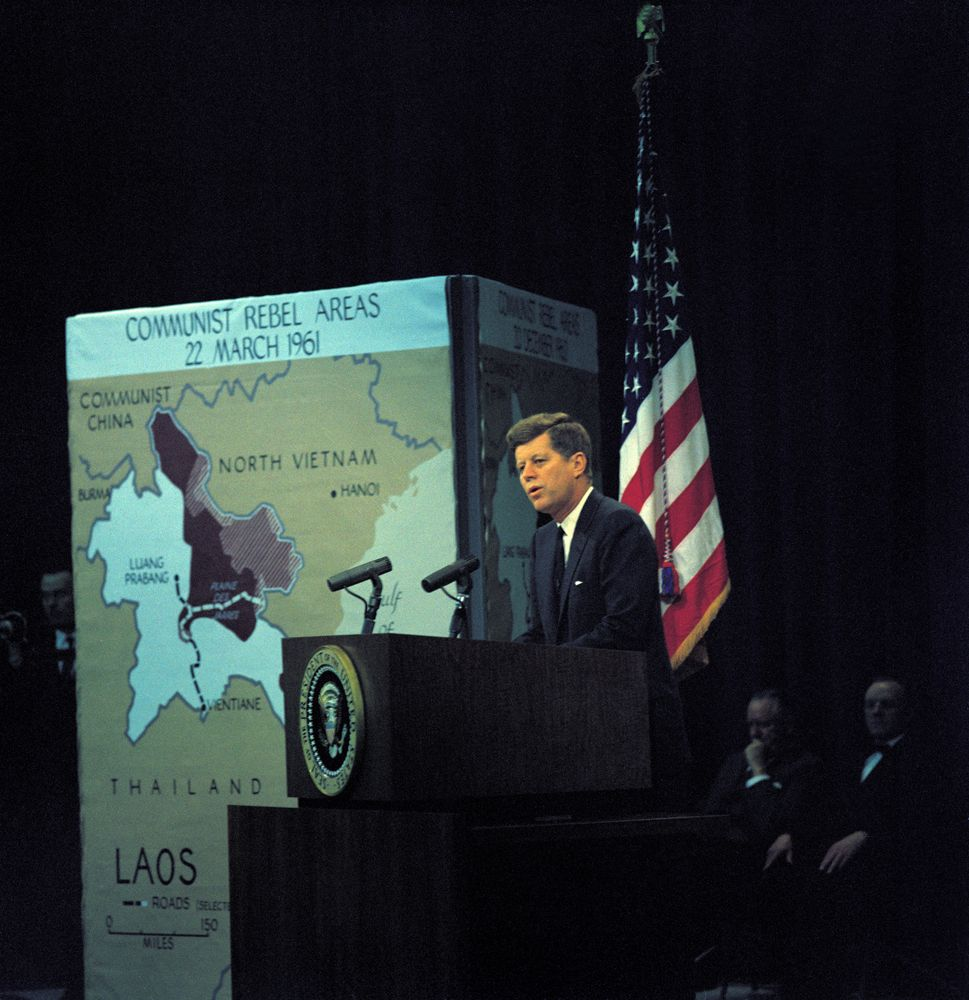
Kennedy speaking in a televised press conference on the situation in Southeast Asia, c. March 23, 1961

==== Laos ====
When briefing Kennedy, Eisenhower emphasized that the communist threat in Southeast Asia required priority. Eisenhower considered Laos to be "the cork in the bottle;" if it fell to communism, Eisenhower believed other Southeast Asian countries would as well. The Joint Chiefs proposed sending 60,000 American soldiers to uphold the friendly government, but Kennedy rejected this strategy in the aftermath of the failed Bay of Pigs invasion. He instead sought a negotiated solution between the government and the left-wing insurgents, who were backed by North Vietnam and the Soviet Union. Kennedy was unwilling to send more than a token force to neighboring Thailand, a key American ally. By the end of the year, Harriman had helped arrange the International Agreement on the Neutrality of Laos, which temporarily brought an end to the crisis, but the Laotian Civil War continued. Though he was unwilling to commit U.S. forces to a major military intervention in Laos, Kennedy did approve CIA activities in Laos designed to defeat communist insurgents through bombing raids and the recruitment of the Hmong people.

==== Vietnam ====
As a U.S. congressman in 1951, Kennedy became fascinated with Vietnam after visiting the area as part of a fact-finding mission to Asia and the Middle East, even stressing in a subsequent radio address that he strongly favored "check[ing] the southern drive of communism." As a U.S. senator in 1956, Kennedy publicly advocated for greater U.S. involvement in Vietnam. During his presidency, Kennedy continued policies that provided political, economic, and military support to the South Vietnamese government.

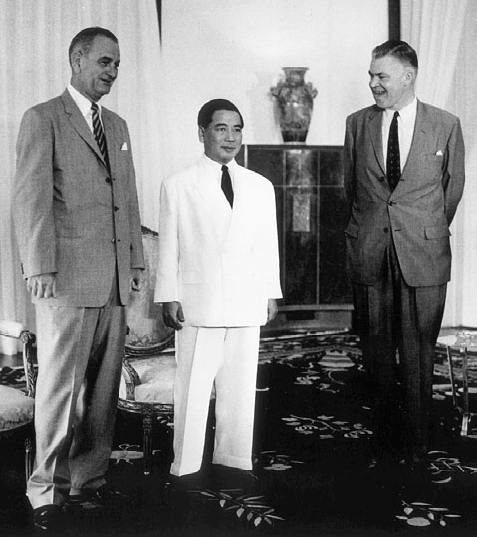
South Vietnamese President Ngo Dinh Diem with Vice President Johnson and Ambassador Frederick Nolting, c. 1961

The Viet Cong began assuming a predominant presence in late 1961, initially seizing the provincial capital of Phuoc Vinh. After a mission to Vietnam in October, presidential adviser General Maxwell D. Taylor and Deputy National Security Adviser Walt Rostow recommended the deployment of 6,000 to 8,000 U.S. combat troops to Vietnam. Kennedy increased the number of military advisers and special forces in the area, from 11,000 in 1962 to 16,000 by late 1963, but he was reluctant to order a full-scale deployment of troops. However, Kennedy, who was wary about the region's successful war of independence against France, was also eager to not give the impression to the Vietnamese people that the United States was acting as the region's new colonizer, even stating in his journal at one point that the United States was "more and more becoming colonists in the minds of the people."

In late 1961, Kennedy sent Roger Hilsman, then director of the State Department's Bureau of Intelligence and Research (INR), to assess the situation in Vietnam. There, Hilsman met Sir Robert Grainger Ker Thompson, head of the British Advisory Mission to South Vietnam, and the Strategic Hamlet Program was formed. It was approved by Kennedy and South Vietnam President Ngo Dinh Diem. It was implemented in early 1962 and involved some forced relocation, village internment, and segregation of rural South Vietnamese into new communities where the peasantry would be isolated from communist insurgents. It was hoped that these new communities would provide security for the peasants and strengthen the tie between them and the central government. By November 1963, the program waned and officially ended in 1964.

On January 18, 1962, Kennedy formally authorized escalated involvement when he signed the National Security Action Memorandum (NSAM) – "Subversive Insurgency (War of Liberation)". "Operation Ranch Hand", a large-scale aerial defoliation effort, began on the roadsides of South Vietnam initiating the use of the herbicide Agent Orange on foliage and to combat guerrilla defendants. Initially under consideration as to whether or not the use of the chemical would violate the Geneva Convention, Secretary of State Dean Rusk argued to Kennedy that "[t]he use of defoliant does not violate any rule of international law concerning the conduct of chemical warfare and is an accepted tactic of war. Precedent has been established by the British during the emergency in Malaya in their use of aircraft for destroying crops by chemical spraying."

In August 1963, Henry Cabot Lodge Jr. replaced Frederick Nolting as the U.S. ambassador to South Vietnam. Days after Lodge's arrival in South Vietnam, Diem and his brother Ngo Dinh Nhu ordered South Vietnam forces, funded and trained by the CIA, to quell Buddhist demonstrations. The crackdowns heightened expectations of a coup d'état to remove Diem with (or perhaps by) his brother, Nhu. Lodge was instructed to try getting Diem and Nhu to step down and leave the country. Diem would not listen to Lodge. Cable 243 (DEPTEL 243) followed, dated August 24, declaring that Washington would no longer tolerate Nhu's actions, and Lodge was ordered to pressure Diem to remove Nhu. Lodge concluded that the only option was to get the South Vietnamese generals to overthrow Diem and Nhu. At week's end, orders were sent to Saigon and throughout Washington to "destroy all coup cables". At the same time, the first formal anti-Vietnam war sentiment was expressed by U.S. clergy from the Ministers' Vietnam Committee.

A White House meeting in September was indicative of the different ongoing appraisals; Kennedy received updated assessments after personal inspections on the ground by the Departments of Defense (General Victor Krulak) and State (Joseph Mendenhall). Krulak said that the military fight against the communists was progressing and being won, while Mendenhall stated that the country was civilly being lost to any U.S. influence. Kennedy reacted, asking, "Did you two gentlemen visit the same country?" Kennedy was unaware that both men were so much at odds that they did not speak to each other on the return flight.

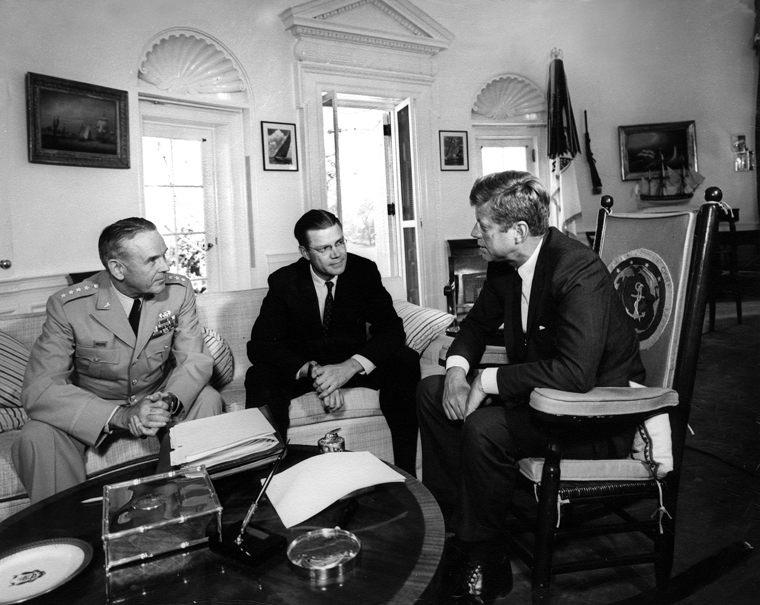
General Maxwell D. Taylor and Secretary Robert McNamara report to President Kennedy on their recent survey trip to South Vietnam, c. October 1963

In October 1963, Kennedy appointed Defense Secretary McNamara and General Maxwell D. Taylor to a Vietnamese mission in another effort to synchronize the information and formulation of policy. The objective of the McNamara–Taylor mission "emphasized the importance of getting to the bottom of the differences in reporting from U.S. representatives in Vietnam." In meetings with McNamara, Taylor, and Lodge, Diem again refused to agree to governing measures, helping to dispel McNamara's previous optimism about Diem. Taylor and McNamara were enlightened by Vietnam's vice president, Nguyen Ngoc Tho (choice of many to succeed Diem), who in detailed terms obliterated Taylor's information that the military was succeeding in the countryside. At Kennedy's insistence, the mission report contained a recommended schedule for troop withdrawals: 1,000 by year's end and complete withdrawal in 1965, something the NSC considered to be a "strategic fantasy." In late-October, intelligence wires again reported that a coup against the Diem government was afoot. The source, Vietnamese General Duong Van Minh (also known as "Big Minh"), wanted to know the U.S. position. Kennedy instructed Lodge to offer covert assistance to the coup, excluding assassination. On November 1, 1963, South Vietnamese generals, led by "Big Minh", overthrew the Diem government, arresting and then killing Diem and Nhu. Kennedy was shocked by the deaths.

Historians disagree on whether the Vietnam War would have escalated if Kennedy had not been assassinated and had won re-election in 1964. Fueling the debate were statements made by Secretary of Defense McNamara in the 2003 documentary film The Fog of War that Kennedy was strongly considering pulling the United States out of Vietnam after the 1964 election. The film also contains a tape recording of Lyndon Johnson stating that Kennedy was planning to withdraw, a position with which Johnson disagreed. Conversely, in 2008, Kennedy administration White House Counsel and speechwriter Ted Sorensen wrote, "I would like to believe that Kennedy would have found a way to withdraw all American instructors and advisors [from Vietnam]. But even someone who knew JFK as well as I did can't be certain, because I do not believe he knew in his last weeks what he was going to do." Sorensen added that, in his opinion, Vietnam "was the only foreign policy problem handed off by JFK to his successor in no better, and possibly worse, shape than it was when he inherited it."

At the time of Kennedy's death, no final policy decision was made with respect to Vietnam. By November 1963, there were 16,000 American military personnel in South Vietnam, up from Eisenhower's 900 advisors. More than one hundred Americans had been killed in action. In the aftermath of the aborted coup in September 1963, the Kennedy administration reevaluated its policies in South Vietnam. Kennedy rejected both the full-scale deployment of ground soldiers, but also rejected the total withdrawal of U.S. forces from the country. On October 11, Kennedy signed NSAM 263 ordering the withdrawal of 1,000 military personnel by year's end following the third recommendation of the McNamara–Taylor mission report, which concluded that the training program for the South Vietnamese military had sufficiently progressed to justify the withdrawal. However, NSAM 263 also approved the first recommendation of the report to continue providing support to South Vietnam to prevent the spread of communism and until the Viet Cong was suppressed, while the third recommendation suggested that even if the majority of the U.S. military objective was completed by the end of 1965 that continued presence of U.S. training personnel in more limited numbers could be necessary if the insurgency was not suppressed.

=== Latin America ===
Official motion picture on Kennedy's tour of Latin America in December 1961.

Kennedy sought to contain the threat of communism in Latin America by establishing the Alliance for Progress, which sent aid to some countries and sought greater human rights standards in the region. The Alliance for Progress drew from the Good Neighbor Policy in its peaceful engagement with Latin America, and from the Marshall Plan in its expansion of aid and economic relationships. Kennedy also emphasized close personal relations with Latin American leaders, frequently hosting them in the White House. The U.S. Information Agency was given an important role of reaching out to Latin Americans in Spanish, Portuguese, and French media. The goals of the Alliance for Progress included long-term permanent improvement in living conditions through the advancement of industrialization, the improvement of communications systems, the reduction of trade barriers, and an increase in the number and diversity of exports from Latin America. At a theoretical level, Kennedy's planners hoped to reverse the under-development of the region and its dependency on North America. Part of the administration's motivation was the fear that Castro's Cuba would introduce anti-American political and economic changes if development did not take place. In response to Kennedy's plea, Congress voted for an initial grant of $500 million in May 1961.

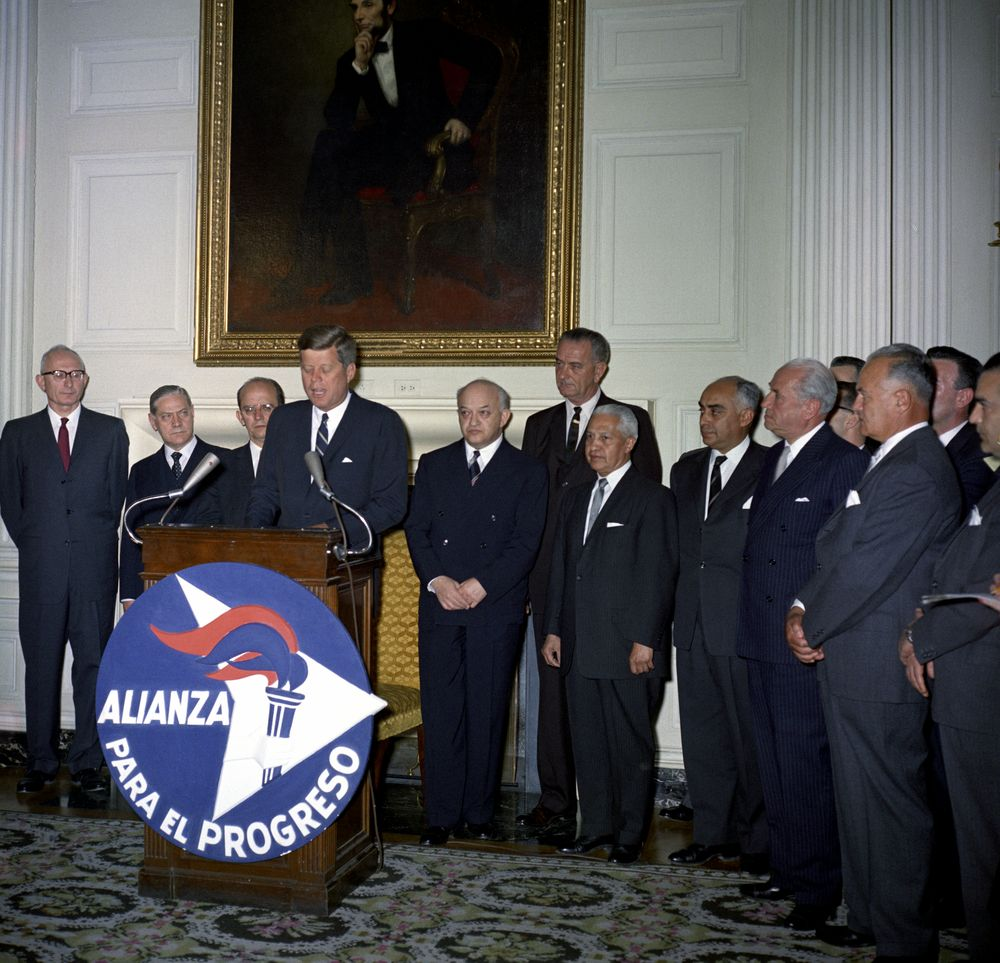
President Kennedy speaks at a reception in honor of the Committee of Nine of the Alliance for Progress, c. March 1962

The Alliance for Progress supported the construction of housing, schools, airports, hospitals, clinics and water-purification projects as well as the distribution of free textbooks to students. However, the program did not meet many of its goals. Massive land reform was not achieved; populations more than kept pace with gains in health and welfare; and according to one study, only 2 percent of economic growth in 1960s Latin America directly benefited the poor. In addition, American business interests continued to be more concerned about the safety of their private investments in Latin America and far less troubled about promoting social and political reform.

U.S. presidents after the Kennedy administration were less supportive of the program and by the early 1970s, the Alliance was considered a failure. In 1973, the permanent committee established to implement the Alliance was disbanded by the Organization of American States.

The administration had no role in the assassination of Rafael Trujillo in the Dominican Republic. It supported the government of Trujillo's successor, Juan Bosch. The CIA launched a covert intervention in British Guiana to deny the left-wing leader Cheddi Jagan power in an independent Guyana, and forced a reluctant Britain to participate. The CIA also engaged in operations in Brazil and Chile against left-wing leaders.

=== Middle East ===
==== Iraq ====
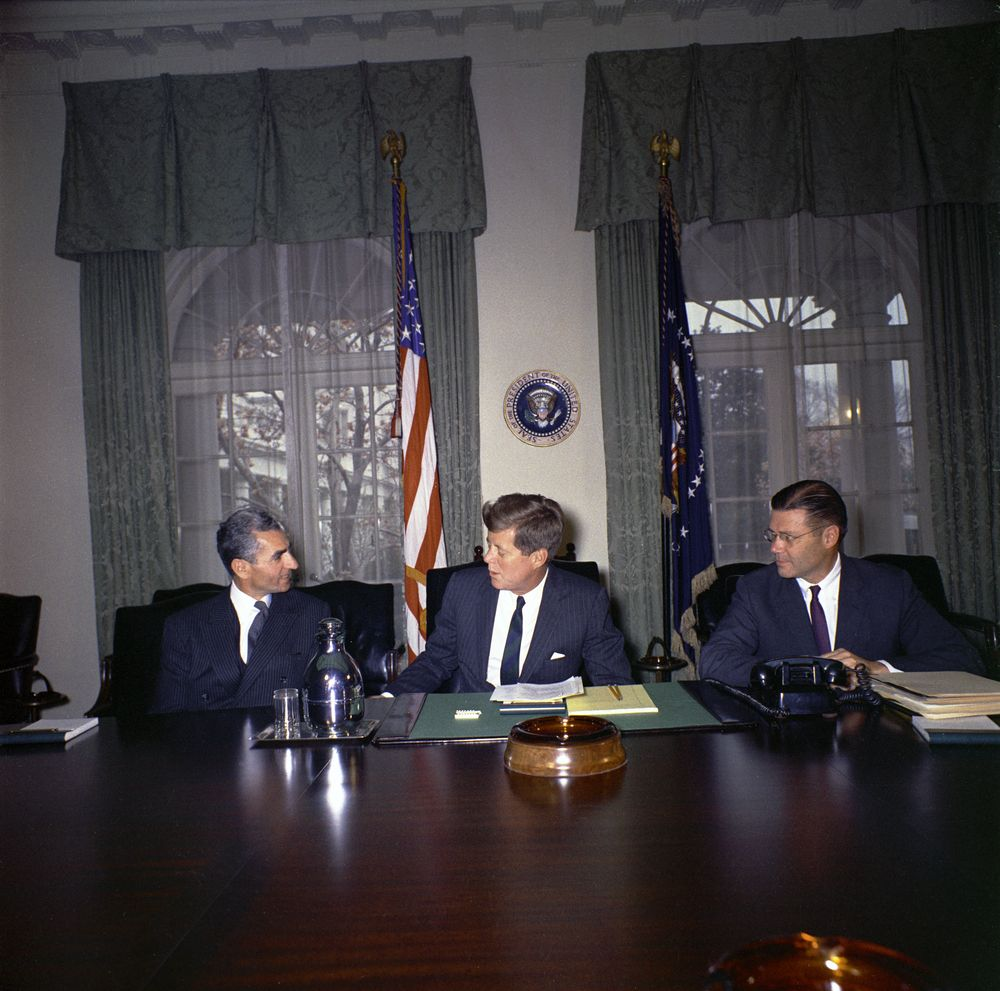
Iran's Shah Mohammad Reza Pahlavi, Kennedy, and U.S. Defense Secretary Robert McNamara in the White House Cabinet Room on April 13, 1962

Relations between the United States and Iraq became strained following the overthrow of the Iraqi monarchy on July 14, 1958, which resulted in the declaration of a republican government led by Brigadier Abd al-Karim Qasim. On June 25, 1961, Qasim mobilized troops along the border between Iraq and Kuwait, declaring the latter nation "an indivisible part of Iraq" and causing a short-lived "Kuwait Crisis". The United Kingdom—which had just granted Kuwait independence on June 19, and whose economy was heavily dependent on Kuwaiti oil—responded on July 1 by dispatching 5,000 troops to the country to deter an Iraqi invasion. At the same time, Kennedy dispatched a U.S. Navy task force to Bahrain, and the U.K. (at the urging of the Kennedy administration) brought the dispute to United Nations Security Council, where the proposed resolution was vetoed by the Soviet Union. The situation was resolved in October, when the British troops were withdrawn and replaced by a 4,000-strong Arab League force.

In December 1961, Qasim's government passed Public Law 80, which restricted the British- and American-owned Iraq Petroleum Company (IPC)'s concessionary holding to those areas in which oil was actually being produced, effectively expropriating 99.5% of the IPC concession. U.S. officials were alarmed by the expropriation as well as the recent Soviet veto of an Egyptian-sponsored UN resolution requesting the admittance of Kuwait as UN member state, which they believed to be connected. Senior National Security Council adviser Robert Komer worried that if the IPC ceased production in response, Qasim might "grab Kuwait" (thus achieving a "stranglehold" on Middle Eastern oil production), or "throw himself into Russian arms." Komer also made note of widespread rumors that a nationalist coup against Qasim could be imminent, and had the potential to "get Iraq back on [a] more neutral keel."

The anti-imperialist and anti-communist Iraqi Ba'ath Party overthrew and executed Qasim in a violent coup on February 8, 1963. While there have been persistent rumors that the CIA orchestrated the coup, declassified documents and the testimony of former CIA officers indicate that there was no direct American involvement, although the CIA was actively seeking a suitable replacement for Qasim within the Iraqi military and had been informed of an earlier Ba'athist coup plot. The Kennedy administration was pleased with the outcome and ultimately approved a $55 million arms deal for Iraq.

==== Israel ====
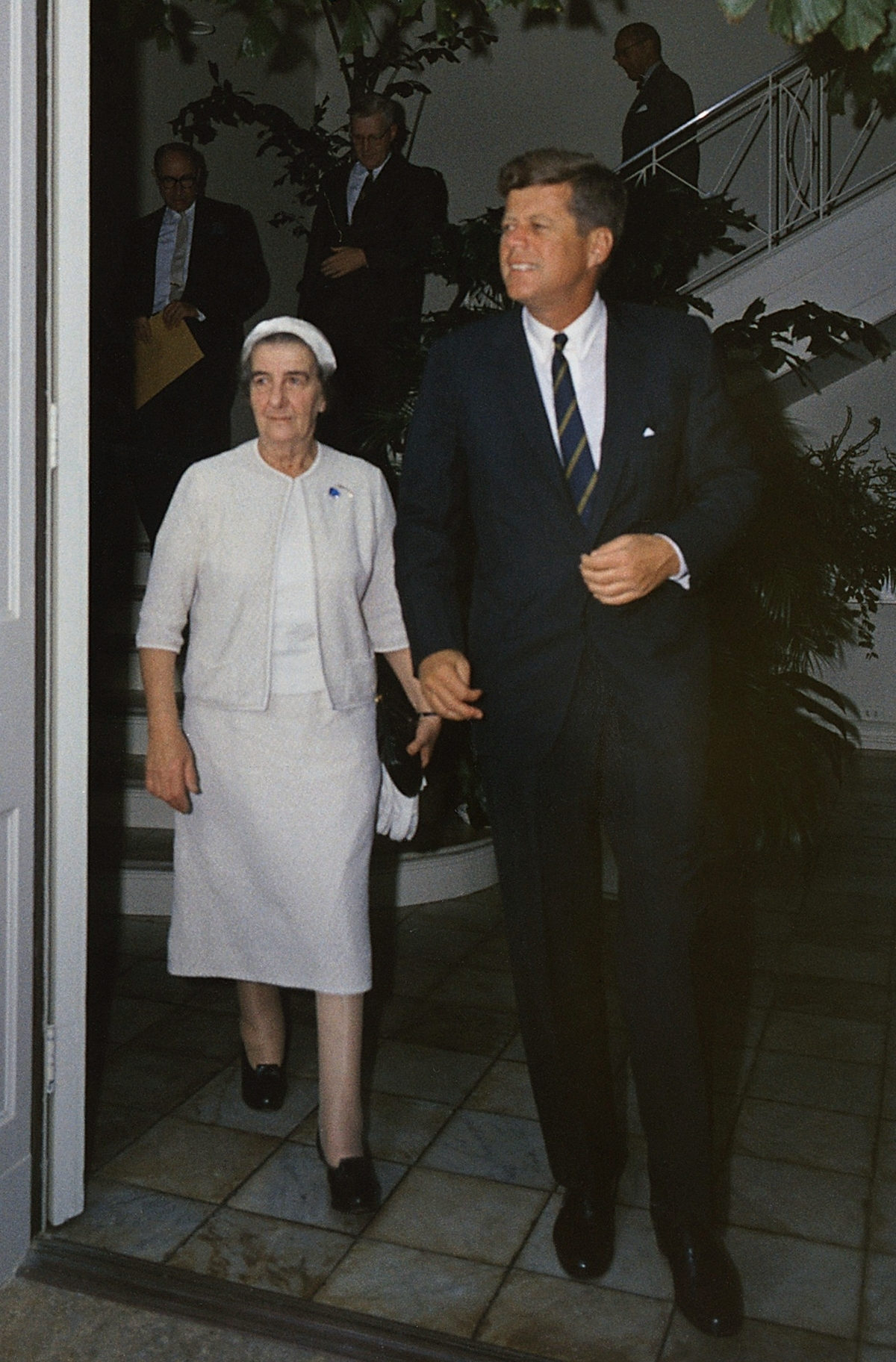
Kennedy with Israeli Foreign Minister Golda Meir, December 27, 1962

In 1960, Kennedy stated, "Israel will endure and flourish. It is the child of hope and the home of the brave. It can neither be broken by adversity nor demoralized by success. It carries the shield of democracy and it honors the sword of freedom."

President Kennedy ended the arms embargo that the Truman and Eisenhower administrations had enforced on Israel in favor of increased security ties, becoming the founder of the U.S.-Israeli military alliance, which would be continued under subsequent presidents. Describing the protection of Israel as a moral and national commitment, he was the first to introduce the concept of a 'special relationship' (as he described it to Golda Meir) between the U.S. and Israel. In 1962, the Kennedy administration sold Israel a major weapon system, the Hawk antiaircraft missile. Historians differ as to whether Kennedy pursued security ties with Israel primarily to shore up support with Jewish-American voters, or because of his admiration of the Jewish state.

Kennedy warned the Israeli government against the production of nuclear materials in Dimona, which he believed could instigate a nuclear arms-race in the Middle East. After the existence of a nuclear plant was initially denied by the Israeli government, David Ben-Gurion stated in a speech to the Israeli Knesset on December 21, 1960, that the purpose of the nuclear plant at Beersheba was for "research in problems of arid zones and desert flora and fauna." When Ben-Gurion met with Kennedy in New York, he claimed that Dimona was being developed to provide nuclear power for desalinization and other peaceful purposes "for the time being." In 1962, the U.S. and Israeli governments agreed to an annual inspection regime. Despite these inspections, Rodger Davies, the director of the State Department's Office of Near Eastern Affairs, concluded in March 1965 that Israel was developing nuclear weapons. He reported that Israel's target date for achieving nuclear capability was 1968–1969.

=== Ireland ===
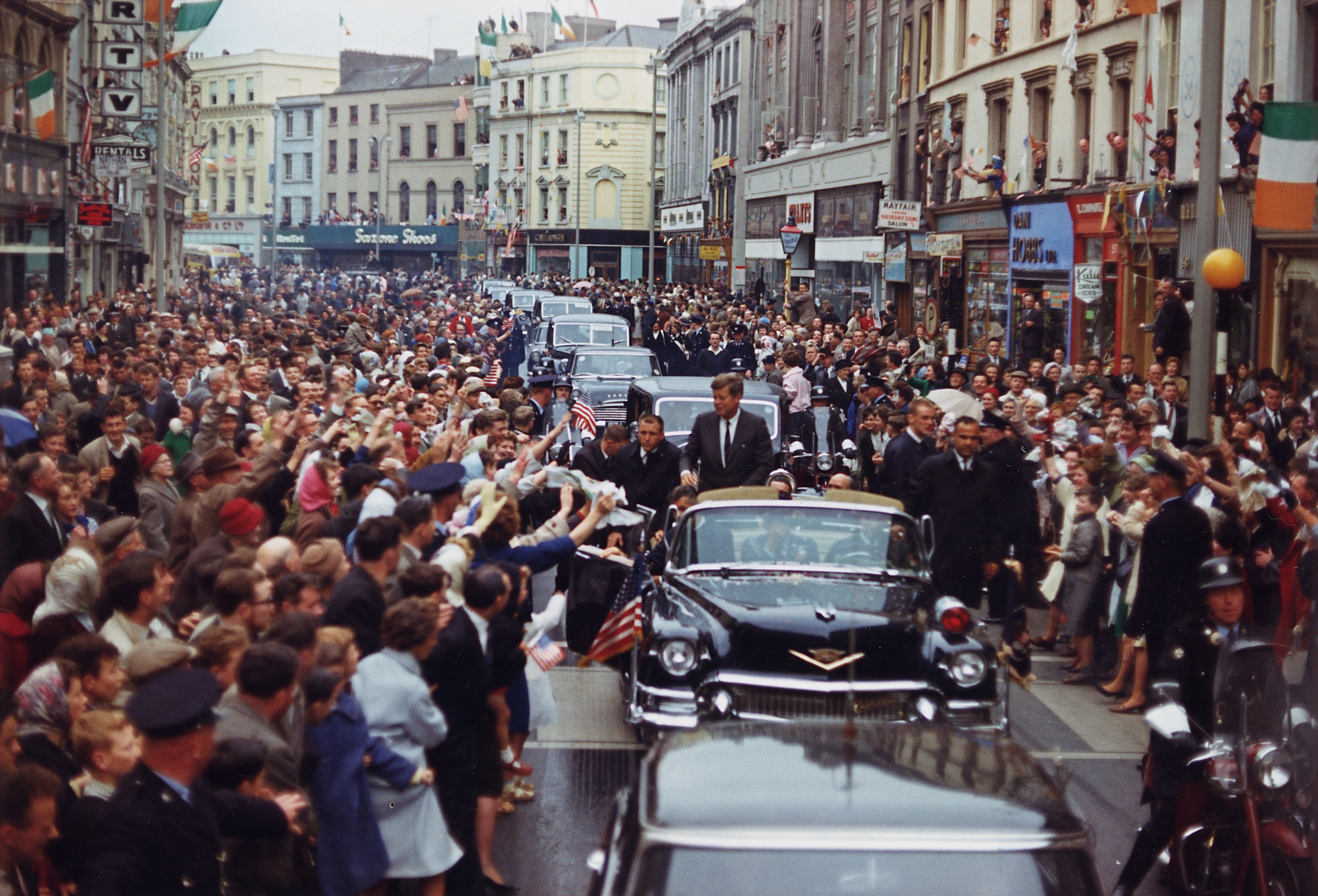
Kennedy's motorcade through Cork, Ireland on June 28, 1963

During his four-day visit to his ancestral home of Ireland beginning on June 26, 1963, Kennedy accepted a grant of armorial bearings from the Chief Herald of Ireland, received honorary degrees from the National University of Ireland and Trinity College Dublin, attended a State Dinner in Dublin, and was conferred with the freedom of the towns and cities of Wexford, Cork, Dublin, Galway, and Limerick. He visited the cottage at Dunganstown, near New Ross, County Wexford, where his ancestors had lived before emigrating to America.

Kennedy was the first foreign leader to address the Houses of the Oireachtas, the Irish parliament. Kennedy later told aides that the trip was the best four days of his life.

=== List of international trips ===
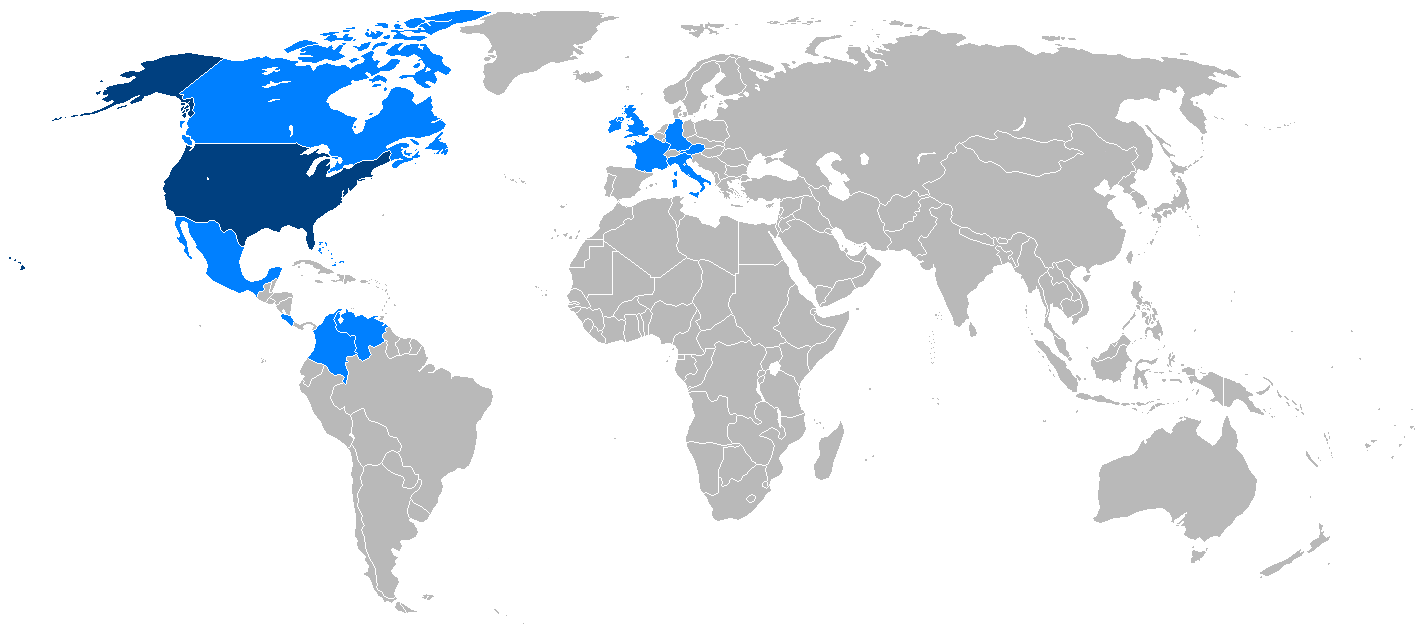
Kennedy made eight international trips to fourteen countries during his presidency.

#	Dates	Country	Locations	Key highlights
1	May 16–18, 1961	Canada	Ottawa	State visit. Met with Governor General Georges Vanier and Prime Minister John Diefenbaker. Addressed parliament.
2	May 31 – June 3, 1961	France	Paris	State visit. Addressed North Atlantic Council. Met with President Charles de Gaulle.
2	June 3–4, 1961	Austria	Vienna	Met with President Adolf Schärf. Held talks with Soviet Premier Nikita Khrushchev.
2	June 4–5, 1961	United Kingdom	London	Private visit. Met with Queen Elizabeth II and Prime Minister Harold Macmillan.
3	December 16–17, 1961	Venezuela	Caracas	Met with President Rómulo Betancourt.
3	December 17, 1961	Colombia	Bogotá	Met with President Alberto Lleras Camargo.
4	December 21–22, 1961	Bermuda	Hamilton	Met with Prime Minister Harold Macmillan.
5	June 29 – July 1, 1962	Mexico	Mexico, D.F.	State visit. Met with President Adolfo López Mateos.
6	December 18–21, 1962	The Bahamas	Nassau	Conferred with Prime Minister Harold Macmillan. Concluded Nassau Agreement on nuclear defense systems.
7	March 18–20, 1963	Costa Rica	San José	Attended Conference of Presidents of the Central American Republics.
8	June 23–25, 1963	West Germany	Bonn, Cologne, Frankfurt, Wiesbaden	Met with Chancellor Konrad Adenauer and other officials.
8	June 26, 1963	West Germany	West Berlin	Delivered several public addresses, including "Ich bin ein Berliner" speech.
8	June 26–29, 1963	Ireland	Dublin, Wexford, Cork, Galway, Limerick	Addressed Oireachtas (parliament). Visited ancestral home.
8	June 29–30, 1963	United Kingdom	Birch Grove	Informal visit with Prime Minister Harold Macmillan at his home.
8	July 1–2, 1963	Italy	Rome, Naples	Met with President Antonio Segni, Italian and NATO officials.
8	July 2, 1963	Vatican City	Apostolic Palace	Audience with the newly elected Pope Paul VI.

== Domestic affairs ==
=== New Frontier ===
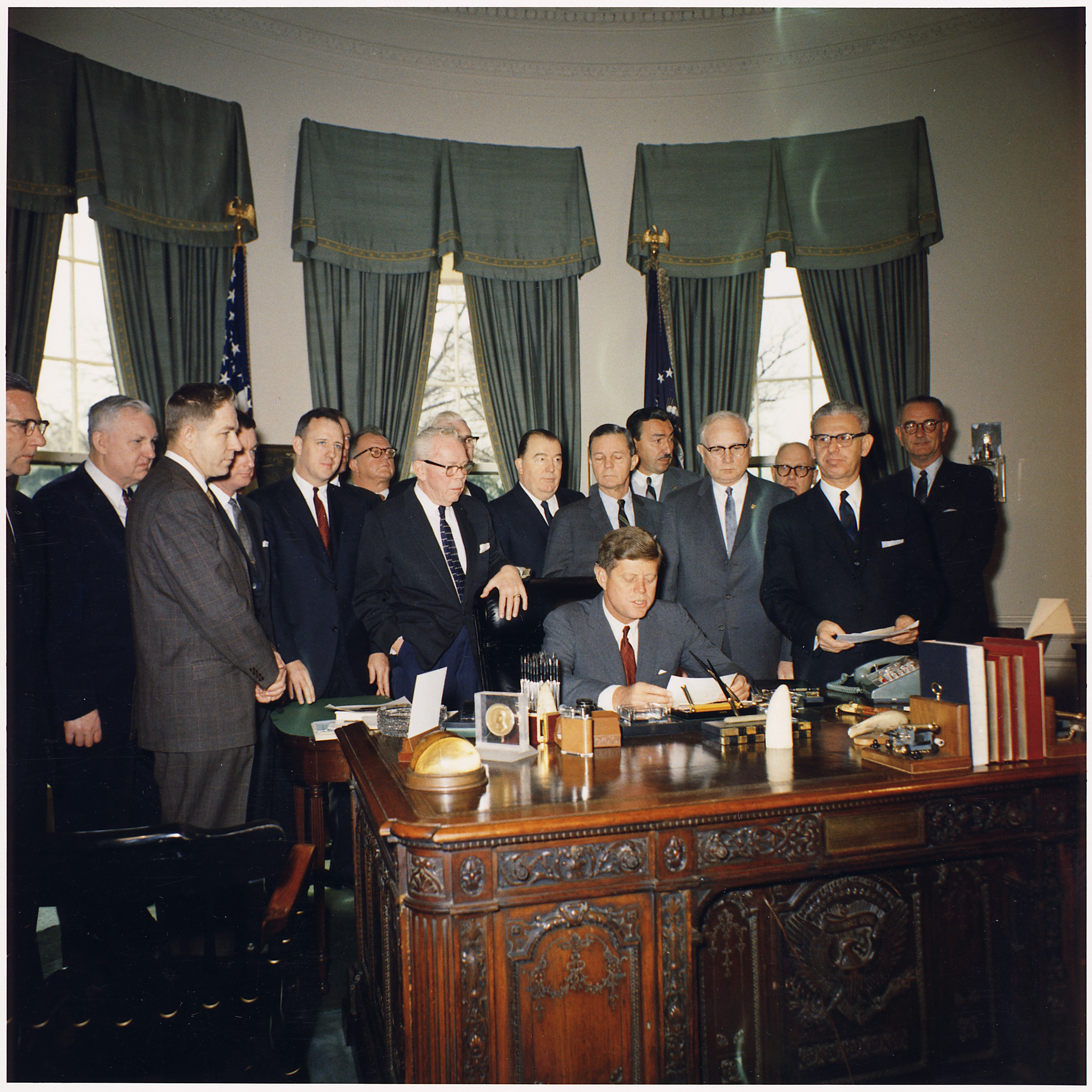
Kennedy signing the Manpower Development and Training Act, c. March 1962

Kennedy called his domestic proposals the "New Frontier"; he included initiatives such as medical care for the elderly, federal aid to education, and the creation of a department of housing and urban development. His New Frontier program can be traced back to the unsuccessful proposals of Franklin D. Roosevelt's 1944 "Second Bill of Rights" address, as well as Harry Truman's Fair Deal. Kennedy pleased conservatives by calling for a large tax cut as an economic stimulus measure. However, nearly all of his programs were blocked by the conservative coalition of Republicans and Southern Democrats. The conservative coalition, which controlled key congressional committees and made up a majority of both houses of Congress during Kennedy's presidency, had prevented the implementation of progressive reforms since the late 1930s. Kennedy's small margin of victory in the 1960 election, his lack of deep connections to influential members of Congress, and his administration's focus on foreign policy also hindered the passage of New Frontier policies. Passage of the New Frontier was made even more difficult after the death of Speaker of the House Sam Rayburn; new Speaker John William McCormack and Senate Majority Leader Mike Mansfield both lacked the influence of their predecessors and struggled to exercise effective leadership over committee chairs.

In 1961, Kennedy prioritized passing five bills: federal assistance for education, medical insurance for the elderly, housing legislation, federal aid to struggling areas, and an increase in the federal minimum wage. Kennedy's bill to increase the federal minimum wage to $1.25 an hour — encapsulated by the Fair Labor Standards Amendments Act — passed in early 1961, but an amendment inserted by conservative leader from Georgia, Carl Vinson, exempted hundreds of thousands of laundry workers from the law. Kennedy also won passage of the Area Redevelopment Act and the Housing Act of 1961. The Area Redevelopment Act, a $394 million program, provided federal funding to economically struggling regions of the country, primarily in Appalachia. It also authorized $4.5 million annually over four years for vocational training programs. Meanwhile, the Housing Act of 1961 allocated federal aid for urban renewal and public housing, and authorized federal mortgage loans to those who did not qualify for public housing. The act also provided funds for the development of mass transportation and for open-space land in the cities. Kennedy proposed a bill providing for $2.3 billion in federal educational aid to the states for public school construction, operation and teacher salaries, with more money going to states with lower per capita income. Though the Senate passed the education bill, it was defeated in the House by a coalition of Republicans, Southern Democrats, and Catholics. Kennedy ultimately — and reluctantly — signed a smaller $900 million education aid bill near the end of the year, which reauthorized titles of the National Defense Education Act of 1958 as well as expired provisions of laws passed by the 81st Congress. Kennedy's health insurance bill, which would have paid for hospitalization and nursing costs for the elderly, failed to pass either house of Congress. Lyndon B. Johnson would ultimately pass a medical insurance bill for the elderly in 1965 as apart of the Social Security Amendments of 1965. A bill that would have established the Department of Urban Affairs and Housing was also defeated because Southern Democrats thought Kennedy would appoint Robert C. Weaver, an African American, as its first secretary.

In 1962, Kennedy won approval of the Manpower Development and Training Act, a three-year program aimed at retraining workers displaced by new technology. The bill did not exclude employed workers from benefiting and it authorized a training allowance for unemployed participants. Its impact on structural unemployment, however, was minimal. In 1963, Kennedy began to focus more on the issue of poverty, and some of the ideas developed during his presidency would later influence President Johnson's War on Poverty.

At the urging of Eunice Kennedy Shriver, President Kennedy made intellectual disabilities a priority for his new administration. The Kennedy family had a personal connection to the issue; the president's sister Rosemary was born with intellectual disabilities. The Community Mental Health Act of 1963 providing funding to local mental health community centers and research facilities. The act proved to be a mixed success. Only half of the proposed centers were ever built; none was fully funded, and the legislation didn't provide money to operate them long-term. Deinstitutionalization accelerated after the adoption of Medicaid in 1965.

Trade policy included both domestic and foreign policy. Here Kennedy had more success, for the conservative coalition was not active in foreign policy. The 1962 Trade Expansion Act passed Congress by wide majorities. It authorized the president to negotiate tariff reductions on a reciprocal basis of up to 50 percent with the European Common Market. The legislation paved the way for the Kennedy Round of General Agreement on Tariffs and Trade (GATT) negotiations, concluding on June 30, 1967, the last day before expiration of the Act.

=== Economy ===
Federal finances and GDP during Kennedy's presidency
Fiscal Year	Receipts	Outlays	Surplus/ Deficit	GDP	Debt as a % of GDP
1961	94.4	97.7	−3.3	546.6	43.6
1962	99.7	106.8	−7.1	585.7	42.3
1963	106.6	111.3	−4.8	618.2	41.1
1964	112.6	118.5	−5.9	661.7	38.8
Ref.					

The economy, which had been through two recessions in three years, and was in one when Kennedy took office, accelerated notably during his presidency. Despite low inflation and interest rates, GDP had grown by an average of only 2.2% per annum during the Eisenhower presidency (scarcely more than population growth at the time), and had declined by 1% during Eisenhower's last twelve months in office. GDP expanded by an average of 5.5% from early 1961 to late 1963, inflation remained steady at around 1%, and unemployment dropped from nearly 7 percent in January 1961 to 5.5 percent in December 1963. Industrial production rose by 15% and motor vehicle sales rose by 40%. This sustained rate of growth in GDP and industry continued until around 1969. Kennedy was the first president to fully endorse Keynesian economics, which emphasized the importance of economic growth as opposed to inflation or deficits. He ended a period of tight fiscal policies, loosening monetary policy to keep interest rates down and to encourage growth of the economy. He presided over the first government budget to top the $100 billion mark, in 1962, and his first budget in 1961 led to the country's first non-war, non-recession deficit.

==== U.S. Steel ====
In 1962, as the economy continued to grow, Kennedy became concerned with the issue of inflation. He asked companies and unions to work together to keep prices low, and met initial success. He implemented guideposts developed by the Council of Economic Advisers that were designed to avoid wage-price spirals in key industries such as steel and automobiles. Kennedy was proud that his Labor Department helped keep wages steady in the steel industry, but was outraged in April 1962 when Roger Blough, the president of U.S. Steel, quietly informed Kennedy that his company would raise prices. In response, Attorney General Robert Kennedy began a price-fixing investigation against U.S. Steel, and President Kennedy convinced other steel companies to rescind their price increases until finally even U.S. Steel, isolated and in danger of being undersold, agreed to rescind its own price increase. Aside from his conflict with U.S. Steel, Kennedy generally maintained good relations with corporate leaders compared to his Democratic predecessors Truman and FDR, and his administration did not escalate the enforcement of antitrust law. His administration also implemented new tax policies designed to encourage business investment.

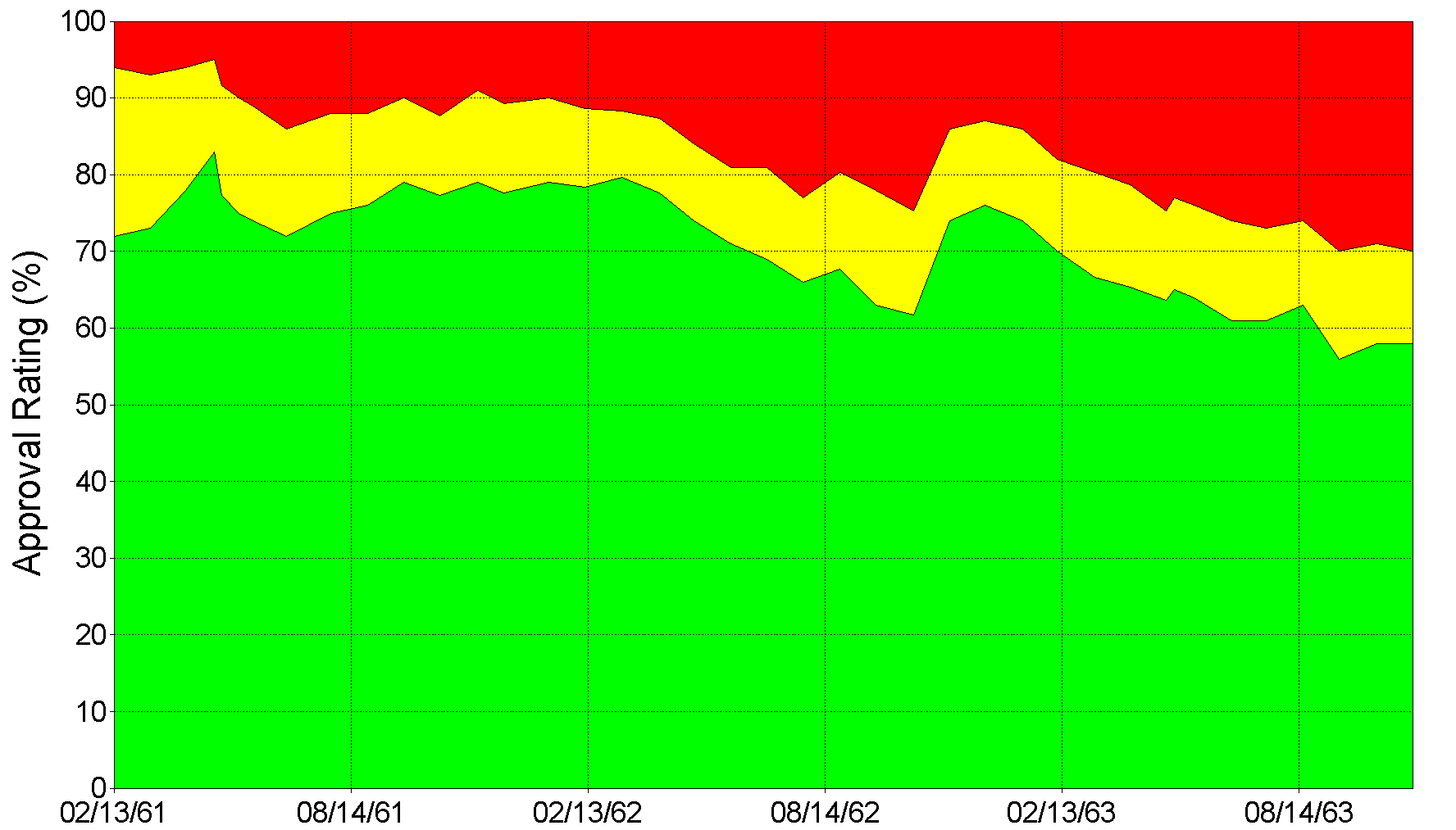
Graph of Kennedy's Gallup approval ratings

=== Taxes and the Treasury ===
Walter Heller, who served as the chairman of the CEA, advocated for a Keynesian-style tax cut designed to help spur economic growth, and Kennedy adopted this policy. The idea was that a tax cut would stimulate consumer demand, which in turn would lead to higher economic growth, lower unemployment, and increased federal revenues. To the disappointment of liberals like John Kenneth Galbraith, Kennedy's embrace of the tax cut also shifted his administration's focus away from the proposed old-age health insurance program and other domestic expenditures. In January 1963, Kennedy proposed a tax cut that would reduce the top marginal tax rate from 91 percent to 65 percent, and lower the corporate tax rate from 52 percent to 47 percent. The predictions according to the Keynesian model indicated the cuts would decrease income taxes by about $10 billion and corporate taxes by about $3.5 billion. The plan also included reforms designed to reduce the impact of itemized deductions, as well as provisions to help the elderly and handicapped. Republicans and many Southern Democrats opposed the bill, calling for simultaneous reductions in expenditures, but debate continued throughout 1963. Three months after Kennedy died, Johnson pushed the plan through Congress. The Revenue Act of 1964 lowered the top individual rate to 70 percent, and the top corporate rate to 48 percent.

In 1961, Kennedy, appointed Republican banker C. Douglas Dillon Treasury Secretary. Dillon remained Treasury Secretary under President Lyndon B. Johnson until 1965. According to Richard Dean Burns and Joseph M. Siracusa, Dillon's leadership of the economic policy team, exerted significant conservative influence on the overall direction of the administration. He effectively convinced the president that the nation's main economic challenge was the balance of payments deficit, leading to the adoption of a moderate approach and the dismissal of more radical liberal solutions to domestic issues. President Kennedy's choice of Dillon as Secretary of the Treasury reflected a deep concern about the balance of payments deficit and the resulting "gold drain." By choosing Dillon, a Wall Street figure with strong Republican connections and a reputation for advocating sound monetary policies, Kennedy aimed to reassure the financial community, which was apprehensive about the potential loose monetary policies of the incoming Democratic administration. According to Theodore Sorensen, the president's choice was primarily influenced by the need to maintain global confidence in the dollar and prevent a massive conversion of dollars into gold. Kennedy shared Dillon's moderately conservative economic perspectives at the time of his appointment, and Dillon enjoyed close access to the president throughout his presidency. He was one of the few political associates who socialized with Kennedy as well. The emphasis placed by Kennedy and Dillon on addressing the balance of payments issue had a substantial impact on the administration's overall economic policy, steering it toward conservatism. The growing annual deficits in dollar payments had led to a significant accumulation of dollars in the hands of foreign banks and governments. The recurring loss of confidence in the value of the dollar prompted foreign holders to exchange their dollars for American gold, which had a fixed value relative to the dollar. This "gold drain" raised concerns within the financial community and remained a prominent issue during both the Kennedy and Johnson administrations. In an effort to stabilize the status of the dollar and halt the outflow of gold, the Kennedy administration avoided economic measures that could potentially increase inflation and undermine foreign confidence in the dollar. During the initial years of Kennedy's presidency, Dillon's success in prioritizing the payments deficit prevented more aggressive fiscal and monetary interventions in the economy or increased spending on social programs.

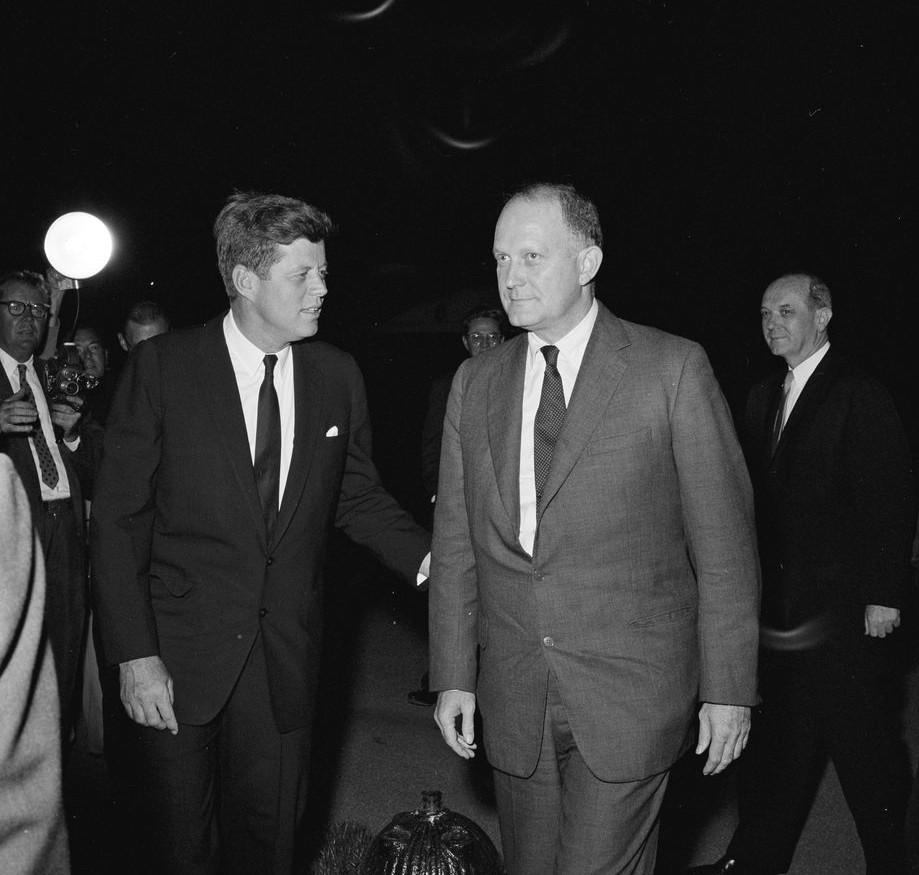
Dillon and Kennedy in August 1961. Dillon had just returned from the conference in Uruguay in which the Alliance for Progress was formalized, and where Dillon did battle with Che Guevara.

On tariff policy, Dillon proposed the fifth round of tariff negotiations under the General Agreement on Tariffs and Trade (GATT), conducted in Geneva 1960–1962; it came to be called the "Dillon Round" and led to substantial tariff reduction. Dillon was important in securing presidential power for reciprocal tariff reductions under the Trade Expansion Act of 1962. He also played a role in crafting the Revenue Act of 1962, which established a 7 percent investment credit to spur industrial growth. He supervised revision of depreciation rules to benefit corporate investment.

Dillon supervised the development of a reform package. He made a case before Congress to withhold taxes on interest and dividend income. The goal was to combat widespread tax evasion. Additionally, he advocated for the closure of loopholes utilized by foreign "tax haven" corporations and businessmen who deducted entertainment expenses. Although Congress rejected most of the administration's reform program during the summer of 1962, Dillon nevertheless endorsed the final package because it included a 7 percent investment tax credit.

=== Civil rights ===
==== Early presidency ====
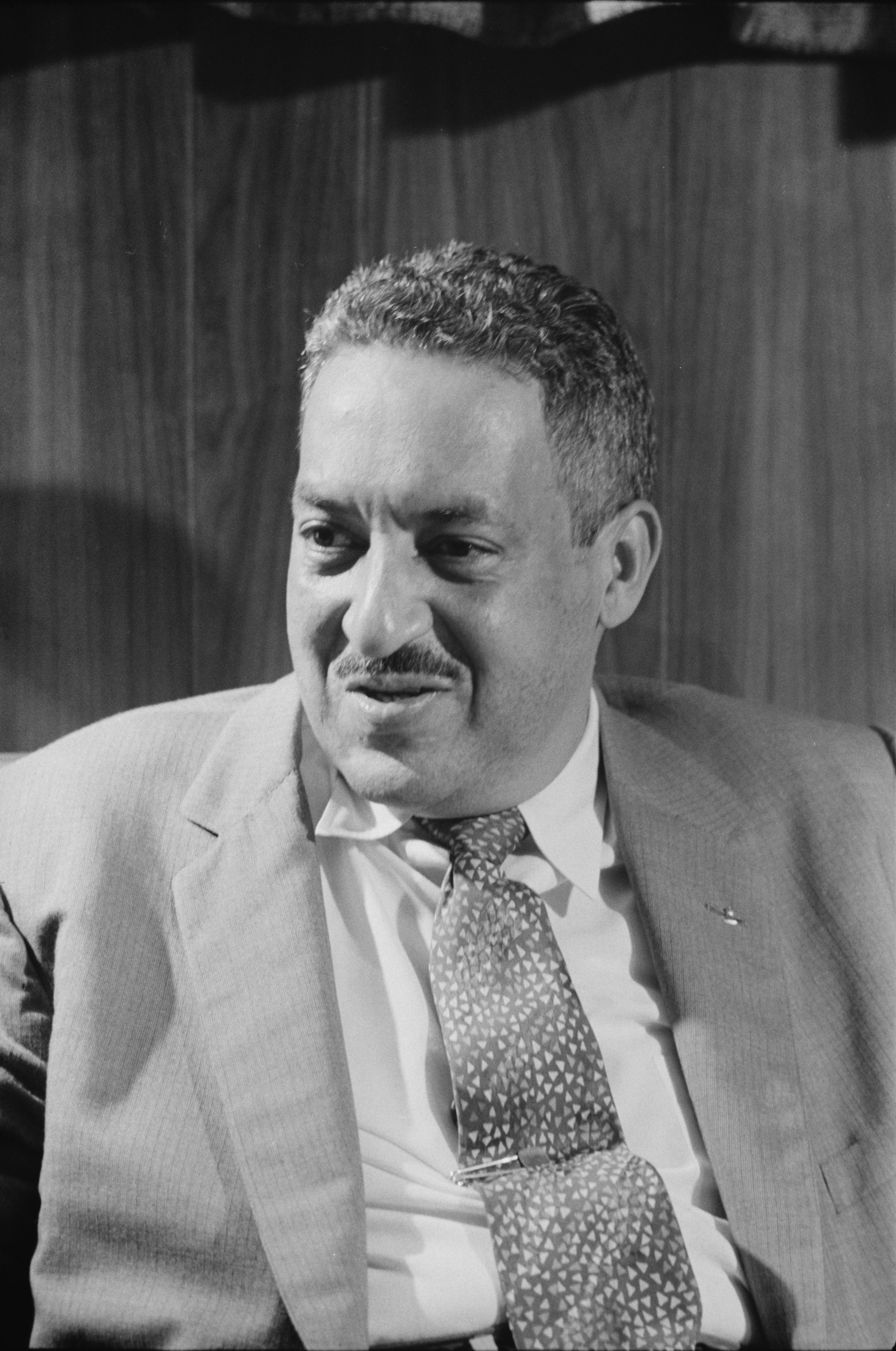
In May 1961, Kennedy appointed Thurgood Marshall to the U.S. Court of Appeals.

The turbulent end of state-sanctioned racial discrimination was one of the most pressing domestic issues of the 1960s. Jim Crow segregation had been established law in the Deep South for much of the 20th century, but the Supreme Court of the United States had ruled in 1954 in Brown v. Board of Education that racial segregation in public schools was unconstitutional. Many schools, especially in southern states, did not obey the Supreme Court's decision. Kennedy favored desegregation and other civil rights causes, but he generally did not place a high priority on civil rights, especially before 1963. Recognizing that conservative Southern Democrats could block legislation, Kennedy did not introduce civil rights legislation upon taking office. He needed their support to pass his economic and foreign policy agendas, and to support his reelection in 1964. Kennedy did appoint many blacks to office, including civil rights attorney Thurgood Marshall to the U.S. Court of Appeals. and Abraham Bolden, the first black Secret Service agent.

Kennedy believed the grassroots movement for civil rights would anger many Southern whites and make it more difficult to pass civil rights laws in Congress, and he distanced himself from it. As articulated by his brother Robert Kennedy, the administration's early priority was to "keep the president out of this civil rights mess." Historian David Halberstam wrote that the race question was for a long time a minor ethnic political issue in Massachusetts where the Kennedy brothers came from, and had they been from another part of the country, "they might have been more immediately sensitive to the complexities and depth of black feelings." Civil rights movement participants, mainly those on the front line in the South, viewed Kennedy as lukewarm, especially concerning the Freedom Riders. In May 1961, the Congress of Racial Equality (CORE), led by James Farmer, organized integrated Freedom Rides to test a Supreme Court case ruling that declared segregation on interstate transportation illegal. The Riders were repeatedly met with white mob violence, including by law enforcement officers, both federal and state. Robert Kennedy, speaking for the president, urged the Freedom Riders to "get off the buses and leave the matter to peaceful settlement in the courts." Kennedy assigned federal marshals to protect the Freedom Riders rather than using federal troops or uncooperative FBI agents. Kennedy feared sending federal troops would stir up "hated memories of Reconstruction" among conservative Southern whites. The Justice Department then petitioned the Interstate Commerce Commission (ICC) to adhere to federal law. By September 1961, the ICC ruled in favor of the petition.

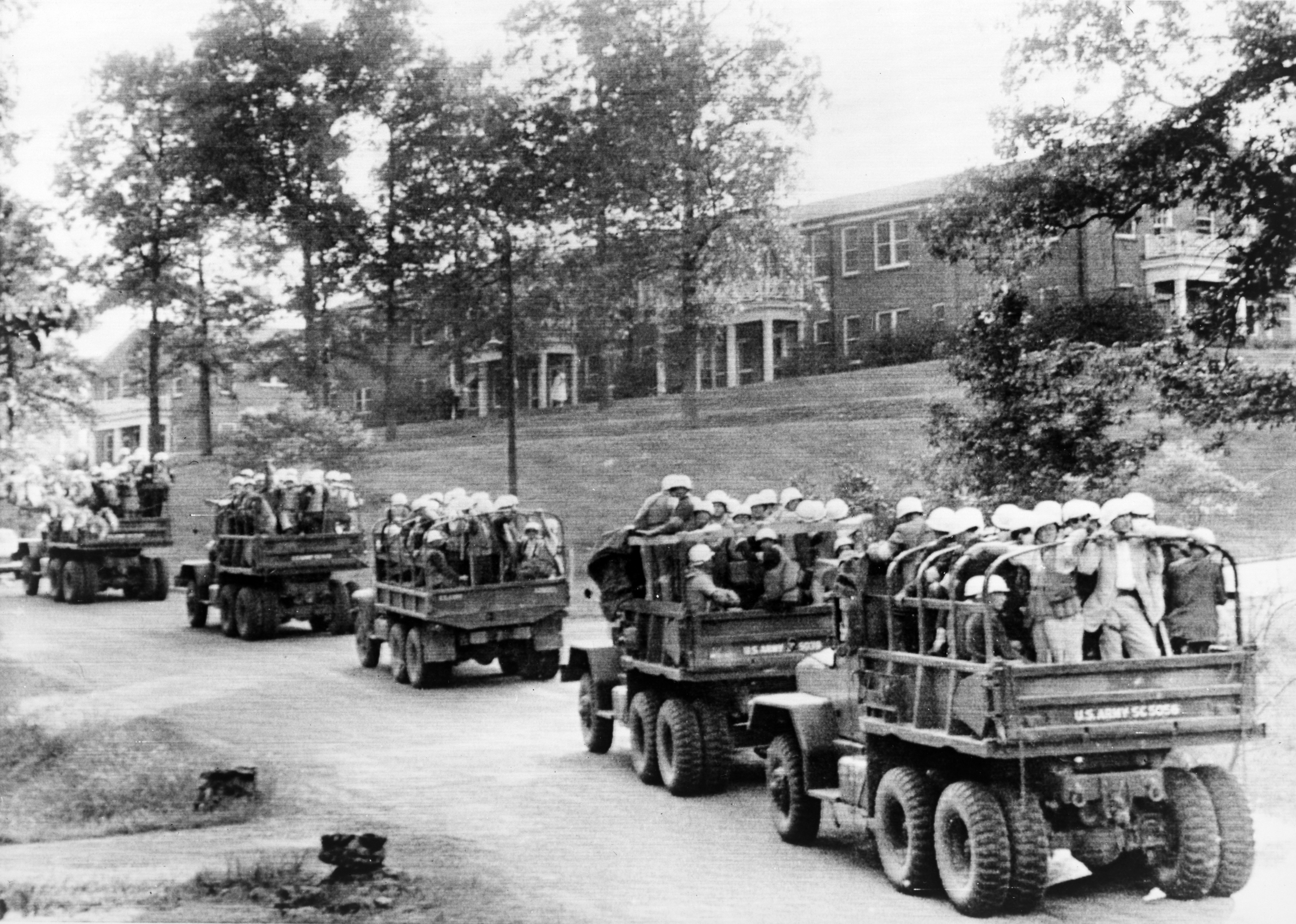
U.S. Army trucks driving across the University of Mississippi campus on October 3, 1962, in the wake of the riot

Ole Miss riot of 1962
Attorney General Robert F. Kennedy and President John F. Kennedy attempted to negotiate with Mississippi Governor Ross Barnett (recording above).

On March 6, 1961, Kennedy signed Executive Order 10925, which required government contractors to "take affirmative action to ensure that applicants are employed and that employees are treated during employment without regard to their race, creed, color, or national origin." It established the President's Committee on Equal Employment Opportunity to investigate employment discrimination and expanded the Justice Department's involvement in voting rights cases. Displeased with Kennedy's pace addressing the issue of segregation, Martin Luther King Jr. and his associates produced a document in 1962 calling on the president to follow in the footsteps of Abraham Lincoln and use an executive order to deliver a blow for civil rights as a kind of "Second Emancipation Proclamation."

In September 1962, James Meredith enrolled at the all-white University of Mississippi but was prevented from entering. Attorney General Robert Kennedy responded by sending 400 federal marshals, while President Kennedy reluctantly sent 3,000 troops after the situation on campus turned violent. The Ole Miss riot of 1962 left two dead and dozens injured, but Meredith did finally enroll in his first class. Kennedy regretted not sending in troops earlier and he began to doubt whether the "evils of Reconstruction" he had been taught or believed were true. On November 20, 1962, Kennedy signed Executive Order 11063, prohibiting racial discrimination in federally supported housing or "related facilities."

==== Abolition of the poll tax ====
Poll tax Cumulative poll tax (missed poll taxes from prior years must also be paid to vote) No poll tax History of the poll tax by state from 1868 to 1966

Sensitive to criticisms of the administration's commitment to protecting the constitutional rights of minorities at the ballot box, Attorney General Robert Kennedy, early in 1962, urged the president to press Congress to take action. Rather than proposing comprehensive legislation, President Kennedy put his support behind a proposed constitutional amendment that would prohibit states from conditioning the right to vote in federal elections on payment of a poll tax or other types of tax. He considered the constitutional amendment the best way to avoid a filibuster, as the claim that federal abolition of the poll tax was unconstitutional would be moot. Still, some liberals opposed Kennedy's action, feeling that an amendment would be too slow compared to legislation. The poll tax was one of several laws that had been enacted by states across the South to disenfranchise and marginalize black citizens from politics so far as practicable without undeniably violating the Fifteenth Amendment. Several civil rights groups (Note: The groups were: American Jewish Congress, American Veterans Committee, Americans for Democratic Action, Anti-Defamation League of B'Nai B'rith, International Union of Electrical Workers (AFL-CIO), National Assn. for the Advancement of Colored People, and United Automobile Workers (AFL-CIO).) opposed the proposed amendment on the grounds that it "would provide an immutable precedent for shunting all further civil rights legislation to the amendment procedure." The amendment was passed by both houses of Congress in August 1962, and sent to the states for ratification. It was ratified on January 23, 1964, by the requisite number of states (38), becoming the Twenty-fourth Amendment to the United States Constitution.

==== 1963 ====
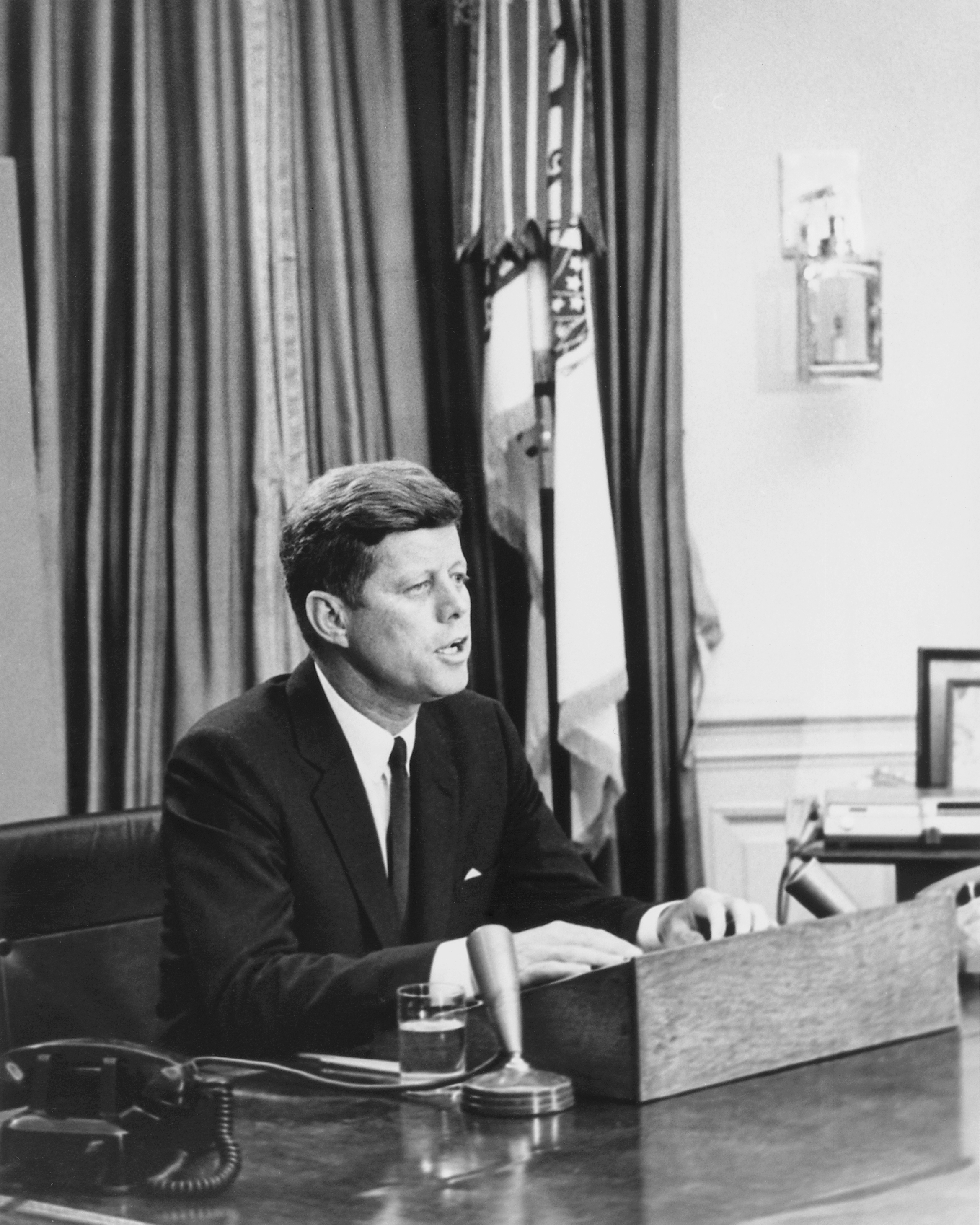
Kennedy addressing the nation on civil rights, June 11, 1963

Disturbed by the violent reaction to the civil rights campaign in Birmingham, and eager to prevent further violence or damage to U.S. foreign relations, Kennedy took a more active stance on civil rights in 1963. On June 11, 1963, President Kennedy intervened when Alabama Governor George Wallace blocked the doorway to the University of Alabama to stop two African American students, Vivian Malone and James Hood, from attending. Wallace moved aside only after being confronted by Deputy Attorney General Nicholas Katzenbach and the Alabama National Guard, which had just been federalized by order of the president. That evening, Kennedy delivered a major address on civil rights on national television and radio. In it, he launched his initiative for civil rights legislation that would guarantee equal access to public schools and other facilities, the equal administration of justice, and also provide greater protection of voting rights. Kennedy's embrace of civil rights causes would cost him in the South; Gallup polls taken in September 1963 showed his approval rating at 44 percent in the South, compared to a national approval rating of 62 percent. House Majority leader Carl Albert called to advise him that his effort to extend the Area Redevelopment Act had been defeated, primarily by the votes of Southern Democrats and Republicans.

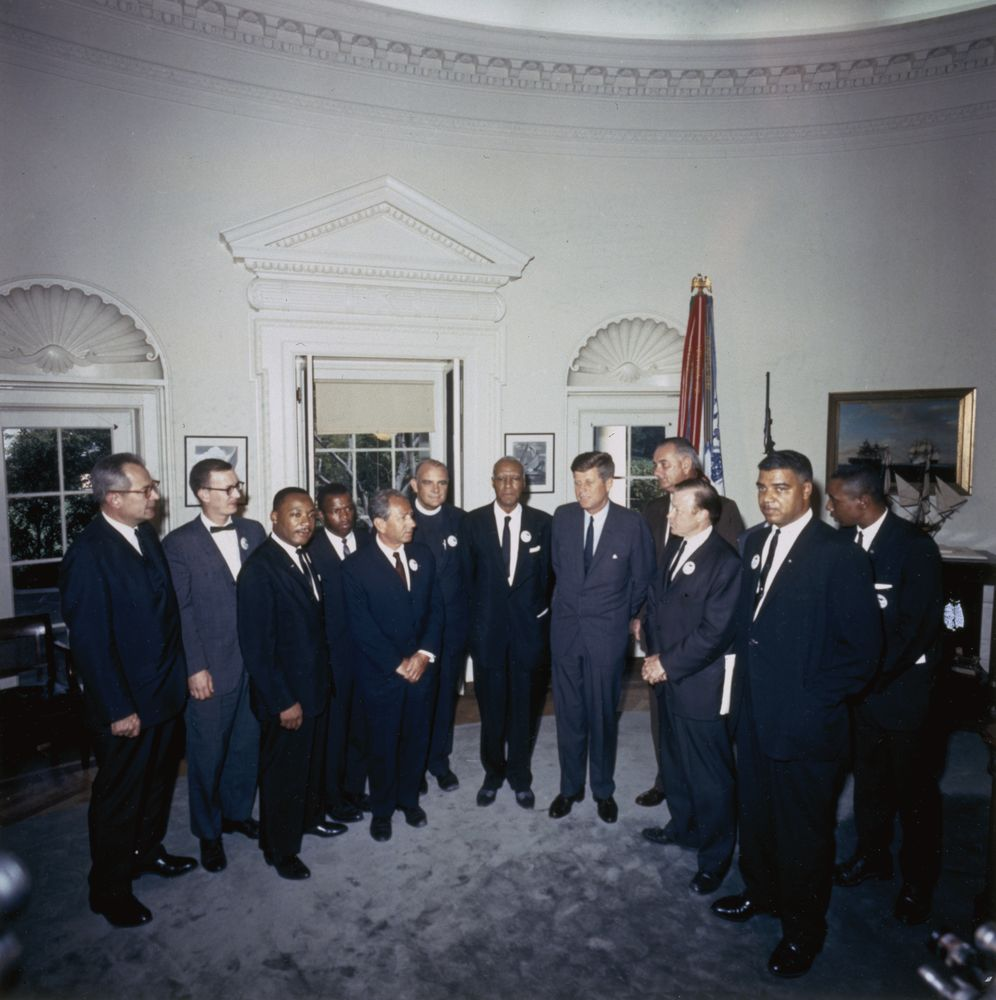
Kennedy meets with leaders of the March on Washington in the Oval Office, August 28, 1963.

A crowd of over 250,000, predominantly African Americans, gathered in Washington for the civil rights March on Washington for Jobs and Freedom on August 28, 1963. Kennedy initially opposed the march, fearing it would have a negative effect on the prospects for the civil rights bills pending in Congress. These fears were heightened just prior to the march when FBI Director J. Edgar Hoover presented Kennedy with reports that some of civil rights leader Martin Luther King Jr.'s close advisers, specifically Jack O'Dell and Stanley Levison, were communists. When King ignored the administration's warning, Robert Kennedy issued a directive authorizing the FBI to wiretap King and other leaders of the Southern Christian Leadership Conference (SCLC). Although Kennedy only gave written approval for limited wiretapping of King's phones "on a trial basis, for a month or so", Hoover extended the clearance so his men were "unshackled" to look for evidence in any areas of King's life they deemed worthy. The wiretapping continued through June 1966 and was revealed in 1968.

The task of coordinating the federal government's involvement in the March on Washington on August 28 was given to the Department of Justice, which channeled several hundred thousand dollars to the six sponsors of the March, including the NAACP and the SCLC. To ensure a peaceful demonstration, the organizers and the president personally edited speeches that were inflammatory and collaborated on all aspects related to times and venues. Thousands of troops were placed on standby. Kennedy watched King's speech on TV and was very impressed. The March was considered a "triumph of managed protest", and not one arrest relating to the demonstration occurred. Afterwards, the March leaders accepted an invitation to the White House to meet with Kennedy and photos were taken. Kennedy felt that the March was a victory for him as well and bolstered the chances for his civil rights bill.

Notwithstanding the success of the March, the larger struggle was far from over. Three weeks later, a bomb exploded on Sunday, September 15 at the 16th Street Baptist Church in Birmingham; by the end of the day, four African American children had died in the explosion, and two other children shot to death in the aftermath. Due to this resurgent violence, the civil rights legislation underwent some drastic amendments that critically endangered any prospects for its passage. An outraged president called congressional leaders to the White House and by the following day the original bill, without the additions, had enough votes to get it out of the House committee. Gaining Republican support, Senator Everett Dirksen promised the legislation would be brought to a vote, preventing a Senate filibuster. The following summer, on July 2, the guarantees Kennedy proposed in his June 1963 speech became federal law, when President Johnson signed the Civil Rights Act of 1964.

=== Space policy ===
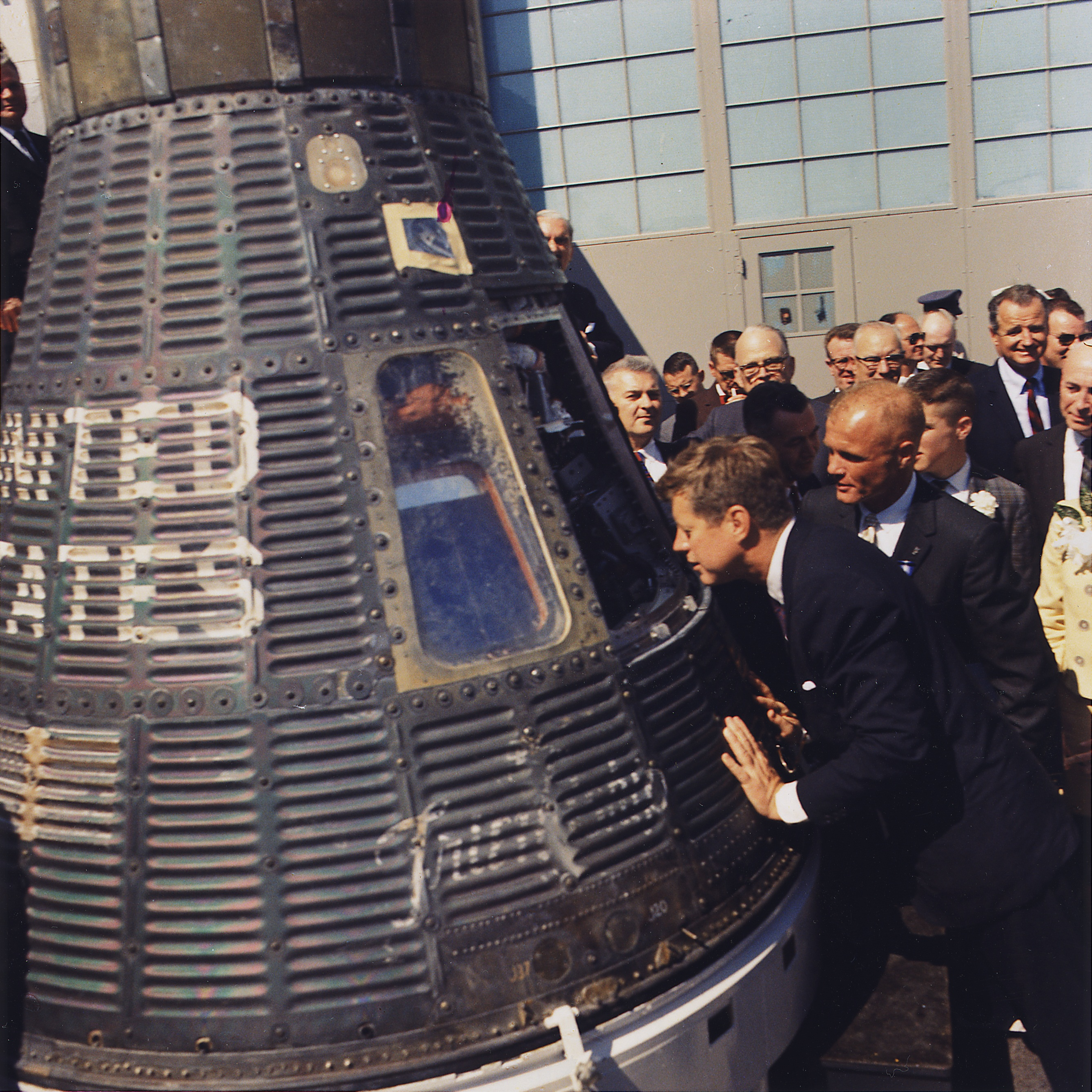
Accompanied by astronaut John Glenn, Kennedy inspects the Project Mercury capsule Friendship 7, February 23, 1962.

The Apollo program was conceived early in 1960, during the Eisenhower administration, as a follow-up to Project Mercury, to be used as a shuttle to an Earth-orbital space station, flights around the Moon, or landing on it. While NASA went ahead with planning for Apollo, funding for the program was far from certain, given Eisenhower's ambivalent attitude to crewed spaceflight. As a U.S. senator, Kennedy had been opposed to the space program and wanted to terminate it.

In constructing his presidential administration, Kennedy elected to retain Eisenhower's last science advisor Jerome Wiesner as head of the President's Science Advisory Committee. Wiesner was strongly opposed to crewed space exploration, having issued a report highly critical of Project Mercury. Kennedy was turned down by seventeen candidates for NASA administrator before the post was accepted by James E. Webb, an experienced Washington insider who served President Truman as budget director and undersecretary of state. Webb proved to be adept at obtaining the support of Congress, the President, and the American people. Kennedy also persuaded Congress to amend the National Aeronautics and Space Act of 1958 to allow him to delegate his chairmanship of the National Aeronautics and Space Council to the Vice President, both because of the knowledge of the space program Johnson gained in the Senate working for the creation of NASA, and to help keep the politically savvy Johnson occupied.

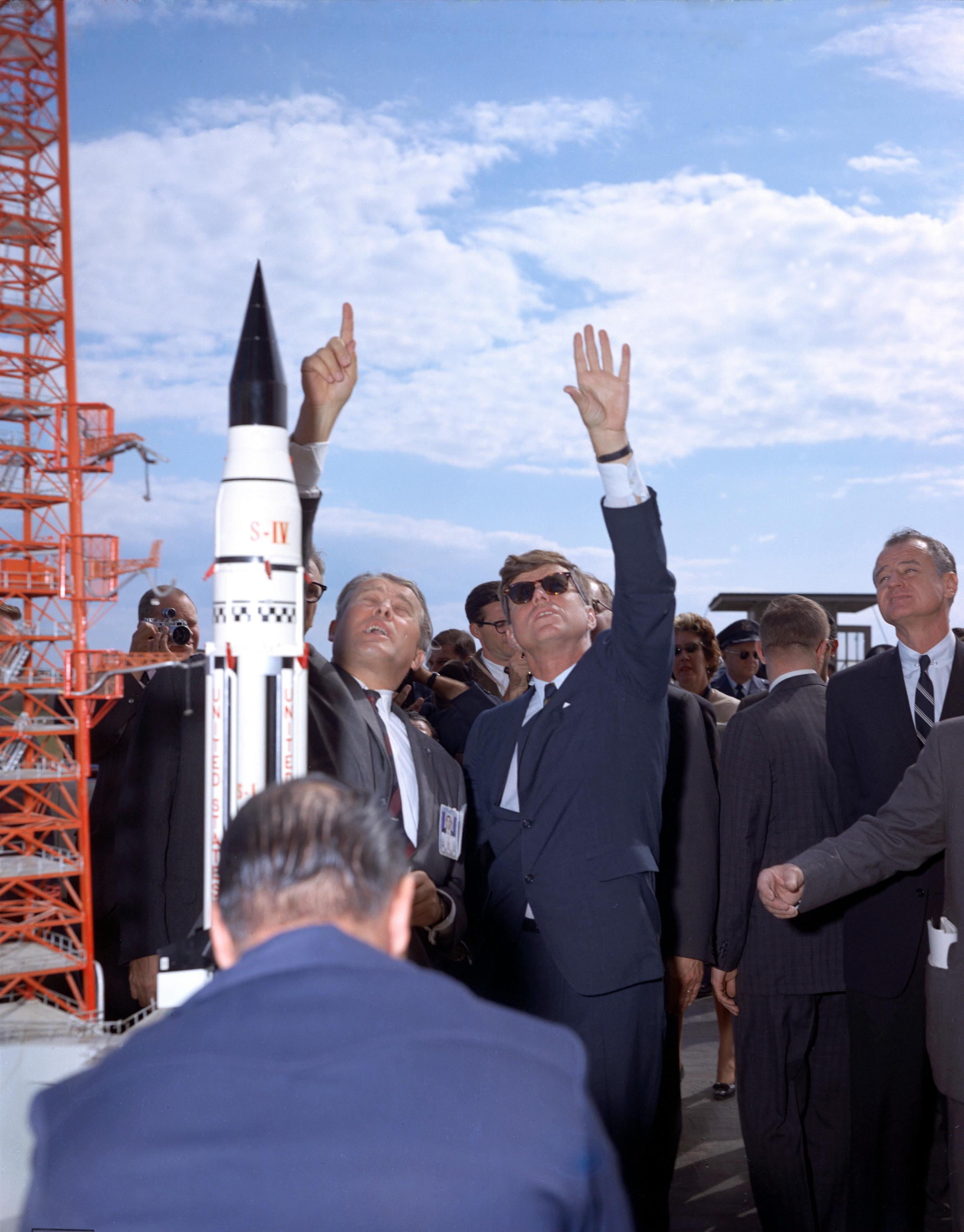
Wernher von Braun explains the Saturn system to President Kennedy during his tour at the Cape Canaveral Missile Test Annex on November 16, 1963

In Kennedy's State of the Union address in 1961, he suggested international cooperation in space. Khrushchev declined, as the Soviets did not wish to reveal the status of their rocketry and space capabilities. Early in his presidency, Kennedy was poised to dismantle the crewed space program but postponed any decision out of deference to Johnson, who had been a strong supporter of the space program in the Senate.

This quickly changed on April 12, 1961, when Soviet cosmonaut Yuri Gagarin became the first person to fly in space, reinforcing American fears about being left behind in a technological competition with the Soviet Union. Kennedy now became eager for the U.S. to take the lead in the Space Race, for reasons of national security and prestige. On April 20, he sent a memo to Johnson, asking him to look into the status of America's space program, and into programs that could offer NASA the opportunity to catch up. After consulting with Wernher von Braun, Johnson responded approximately one week later, concluding that "we are neither making maximum effort nor achieving results necessary if this country is to reach a position of leadership". His memo concluded that a crewed Moon landing was far enough in the future that it was likely the United States would achieve it first. Kennedy's advisor Ted Sorensen advised him to support the Moon landing, and on May 25, Kennedy announced the goal in a speech titled "Special Message to the Congress on Urgent National Needs":

... I believe that this nation should commit itself to achieving the goal, before this decade is out, of landing a man on the Moon and returning him safely to the Earth. No single space project in this period will be more impressive to mankind, or more important for the long-range exploration of space; and none will be so difficult or expensive to accomplish.

Kennedy delivers "We choose to go to the Moon" speech at Rice University, Houston; September 12, 1962 (duration 17:47).

After Congress authorized the funding, Webb began reorganizing NASA, increasing its staffing level, and building two new centers: a Launch Operations Center for the large Moon rocket northwest of Cape Canaveral Air Force Station, and a Manned Spacecraft Center on land donated through Rice University in Houston. Kennedy took the latter occasion as an opportunity to deliver another speech at Rice to promote the space effort on September 12, 1962, in which he said:

No nation which expects to be the leader of other nations can expect to stay behind in this race for space. ... We choose to go to the Moon in this decade and do the other things, not because they are easy, but because they are hard.

On November 21, 1962, in a cabinet meeting with NASA administrator Webb and other officials, Kennedy explained that the Moon shot was important for reasons of international prestige, and that the expense was justified. Johnson assured him that lessons learned from the space program had military value as well. Costs for the Apollo program were expected to reach $40 billion (equivalent to $425.74 billion in 2025).

In a September 1963 speech before the United Nations, Kennedy urged cooperation between the Soviets and Americans in space, specifically recommending that Apollo be switched to "a joint expedition to the Moon". Khrushchev again declined, and the Soviets did not commit to a crewed Moon mission until 1964. On July 20, 1969, almost six years after Kennedy's death, Apollo 11 landed the first crewed spacecraft on the Moon.

=== Status of women ===
During the 1960 presidential campaign, Kennedy endorsed the concept of equal pay for equal work, as well as the adoption of an Equal Rights Amendment (ERA). His key appointee on women's issues was Esther Peterson, the Director of the United States Women's Bureau, who focused on improving the economic status of women. In December 1961, Kennedy signed an executive order creating the Presidential Commission on the Status of Women to advise him on issues concerning the status of women. Former First Lady Eleanor Roosevelt led the commission until her death in 1962; she was opposed to the Equal Rights Amendment because it would end special protections for women workers. The commission's final report, entitled "American Women", was issued in October 1963. The report documented the legal and cultural discrimination women in America faced and made several policy recommendations to bring about change. The creation of this commission, as well its prominent public profile, prompted Congress to begin considering various bills related to women's status. Among them was the Equal Pay Act of 1963, an amendment to the Fair Labor Standards Act, aimed at abolishing wage disparity based on sex (see gender pay gap); Kennedy signed it into law on June 10, 1963.

=== Crime ===
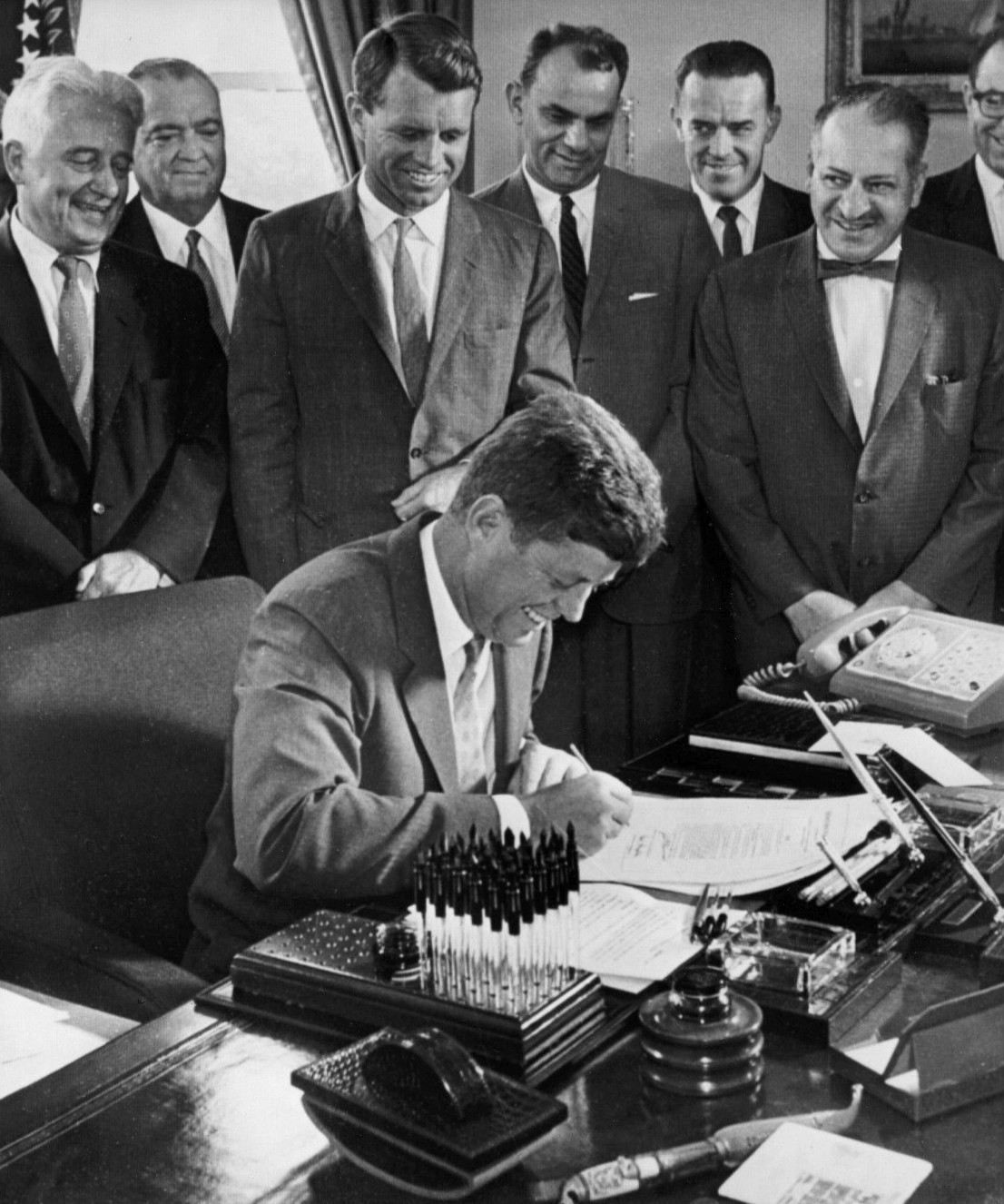
President Kennedy signing anti-crime bills in September 1961. FBI Director J. Edgar Hoover and Attorney General Robert F. Kennedy are in the background.

==== Organized crime ====
The issue of organized crime had gained national attention during the 1950s due in part to the investigations of the McClellan Committee. Both Robert Kennedy and John F. Kennedy had played a role on that committee, and in 1960 Robert Kennedy published the book The Enemy Within, which focused on the influence of organized crime within businesses and organized labor. Under the leadership of the attorney general, the Kennedy administration shifted the focus of the Justice Department, the FBI, and the Internal Revenue Service to organized crime. Kennedy also won congressional approval for five bills (i.e., Federal Wire Act of 1961) designed to crack down on interstate racketeering, gambling, and the transportation of firearms. The federal government targeted prominent Mafia leaders like Carlos Marcello and Joey Aiuppa; Marcello was deported to Guatemala, while Aiuppa was convicted of violating of the Migratory Bird Treaty Act of 1918. The attorney general's top target was Jimmy Hoffa, the head of the Teamsters Union. The Justice Department's "Get Hoffa Squad" ultimately secured the conviction of over 100 Teamsters, including Hoffa, who was convicted of jury tampering and pension fund fraud.

==== Juvenile Delinquency ====
On May 11, 1961, President Kennedy signed Executive Order 10940, establishing the President's Committee on Juvenile Delinquency and Youth Crime (PCJD). Attorney General Robert Kennedy was named chairman, and on September 22, 1961, the Juvenile Delinquency and Youth Offenses Control Act was signed into law. This program aimed to prevent youth from committing delinquent acts.

==== Federal and military death penalty ====
As president, Kennedy oversaw the last federal execution prior to Furman v. Georgia, a 1972 case that led to a moratorium on federal executions. Victor Feguer was sentenced to death by a federal court in Iowa and was executed on March 15, 1963. Kennedy commuted a death sentence imposed by a military court on seaman Jimmie Henderson on February 12, 1962, changing the penalty to life in prison. On March 22, 1962, Kennedy signed into law HR5143 (PL87-423), abolishing the mandatory death penalty for first degree murder in the District of Columbia, the only remaining jurisdiction in the United States with such a penalty.

=== Other issues ===
==== Physical Fitness ====
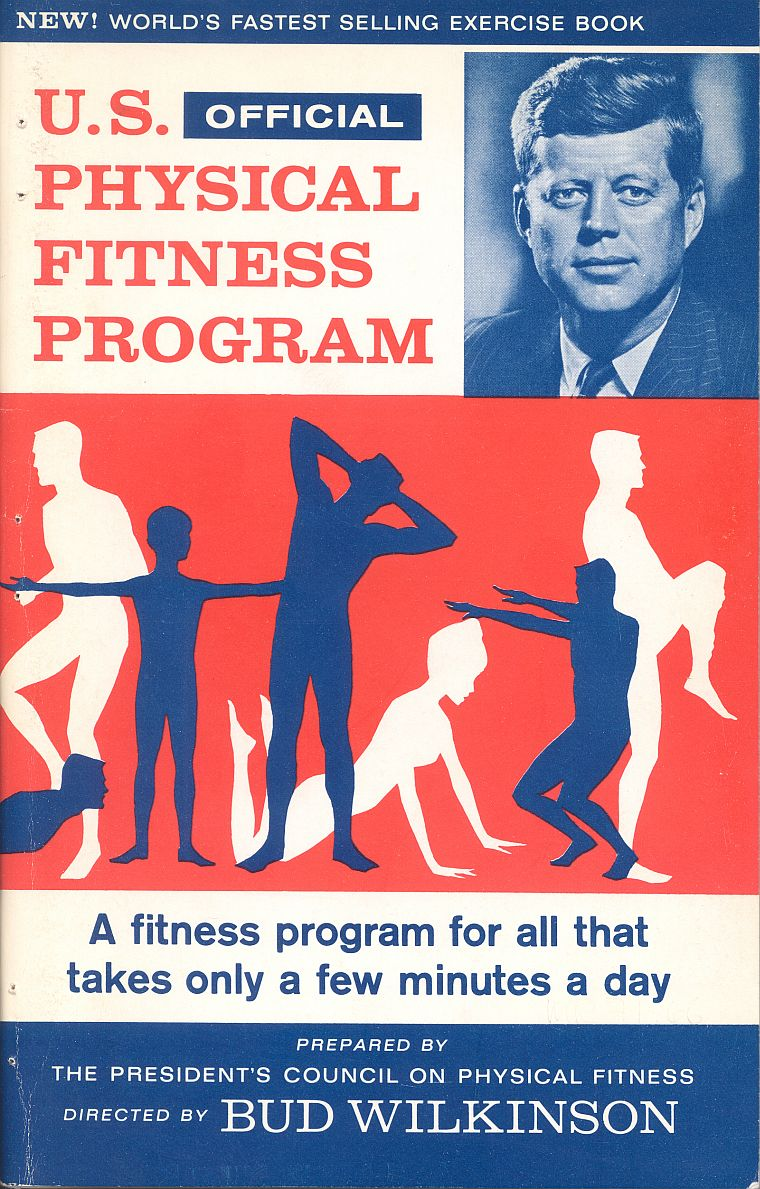
Front cover of U.S. Physical Fitness Program c. 1963

As president-elect, Kennedy wrote an article for Sports Illustrated on December 26, 1960, called "The Soft American" which warned that Americans were becoming unfit in a changing world where automation and increased leisure time replaced the benefits of exercise and hard work. As president, Kennedy addressed the issue of physical fitness frequently in his public pronouncements, and assigned new projects to the President's Council on Physical Fitness and Sports, an organization established by Kennedy's predecessor, President Dwight D. Eisenhower, on July 16, 1956. The idea of a 50-mile hike developed from Kennedy's discovery in late 1962 of an executive order from Theodore Roosevelt, which challenged U.S. Marine officers to finish 50 miles (80 km) in twenty hours, spread out over a maximum of three days. Kennedy passed the document on to his own Marine commandant, General David M. Shoup, and suggested that Shoup bring it up to him as his own discovery, with the proposal that modern day Marines should duplicate this feat. But the real impact of the 50-mile hike was with the public at large. Many Americans took the hike as a challenge from their president. The Kennedy council capitalized on this enthusiasm with a national publicity campaign on physical fitness.

==== Native American relations ====
Construction of the Kinzua Dam flooded 10,000 acres (4,047 ha) of Seneca nation land that they had occupied under the Treaty of Canandaigua in 1794, and forced 600 Seneca to relocate to Salamanca, New York. Kennedy was asked by the American Civil Liberties Union (ACLU) to intervene and to halt the project, but he declined, citing a critical need for flood control. He expressed concern about the plight of the Seneca, and directed government agencies to assist in obtaining more land, damages, and assistance to help mitigate their displacement.

==== Agriculture ====
Kennedy had relatively little interest in agricultural issues, but he sought to remedy the issue of overproduction, boost the income of farmers, and lower federal expenditures on agriculture. Under the direction of Secretary of Agriculture Orville Freeman, the administration sought to limit the production of farmers, but these proposals were generally defeated in Congress. To increase demand for domestic agricultural products and help the impoverished, Kennedy launched a pilot Food Stamp program and expanded the federal school lunch program.

==== Transportation ====
The Kennedy administration tried to increase federal involvement in transportation particularly with urban transit and so did Kennedy himself. The Kennedy administration sent a letter to US Congress in 1962 saying they wanted a plan that did not put too much weight on cars and "one that did not overemphasize car ownership to the detriment of public transportation". Effort was also put into building a supersonic airliner as it was felt the Soviet Union's efforts to build one were a threat.

== Assassination ==
President Kennedy was assassinated in Dallas, Texas, at 12:30 pm Central Standard Time on November 22, 1963, while on a political trip to Texas to smooth over frictions in the Democratic Party between liberals Ralph Yarborough and Don Yarborough and conservative John Connally. Traveling in a presidential motorcade through downtown Dallas with Jackie Kennedy, Connally, and Connally's wife, Nelly, Kennedy was shot in the head and neck. He was taken to Parkland Hospital for emergency medical treatment, but was pronounced dead at 1:00 pm.

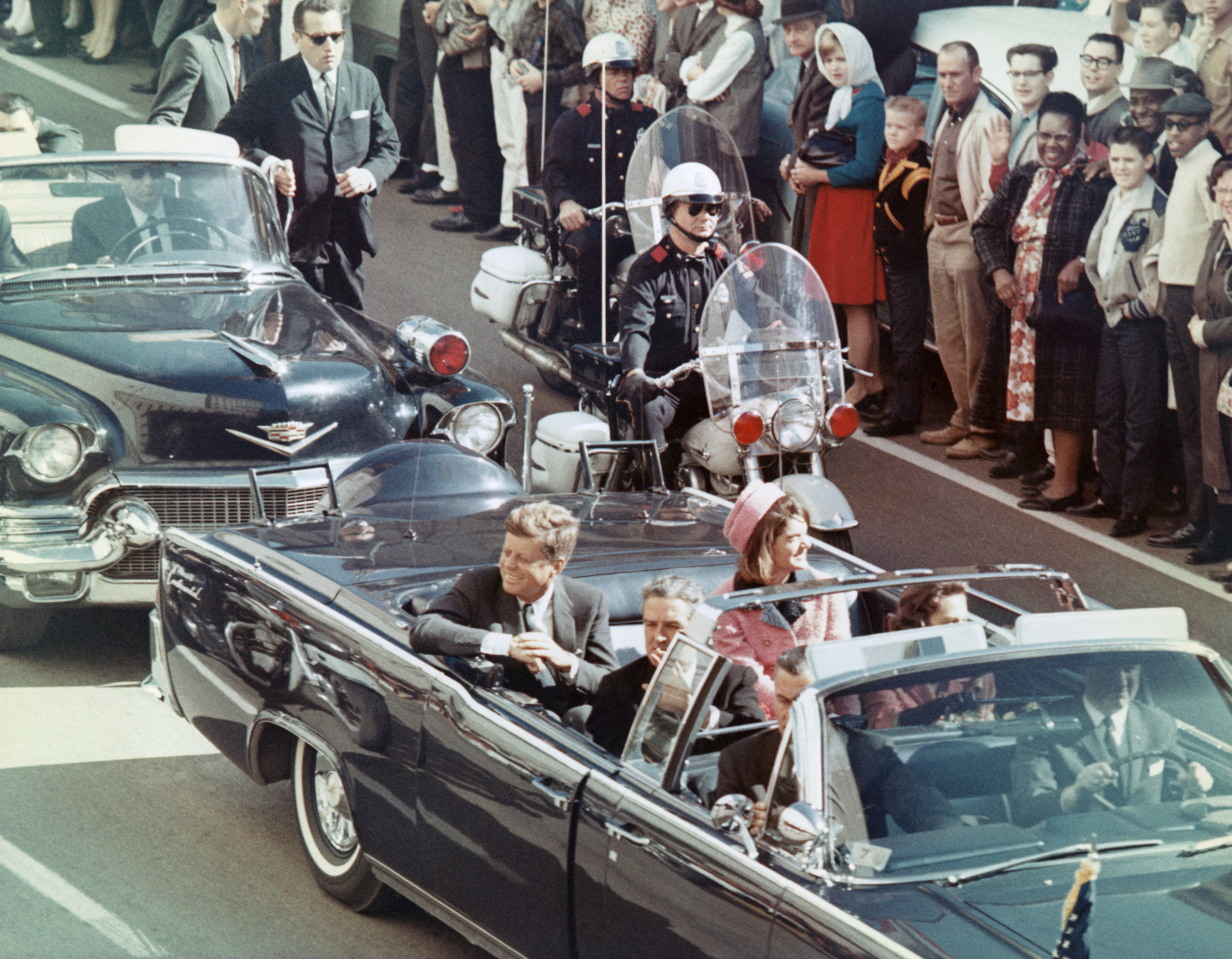
The Kennedys and the Connallys in the presidential limousine moments before the assassination in Dallas

Hours after the assassination, Lee Harvey Oswald, an order filler at the Texas School Book Depository, was arrested for the murder of police officer J. D. Tippit, and was subsequently charged with Kennedy's assassination. Oswald denied the charges, but was killed by strip-club owner Jack Ruby on November 24. Ruby claimed to have killed Oswald due to his own grief over Kennedy's death, but the assassination of Kennedy and the death of Oswald gave rise to enormous speculation that Kennedy had been the victim of a conspiracy. Kennedy was succeeded as president by Lyndon Johnson, who stated on November 27 that "no memorial or oration or eulogy could more eloquently honor President Kennedy's memory than the earliest possible passage of a civil rights bill for which he fought so long."

President Johnson created the Warren Commission—chaired by Chief Justice Earl Warren—to investigate the assassination. The Warren Commission concluded that Oswald acted alone in killing Kennedy, and that Oswald was not part of any conspiracy. The results of this investigation are disputed by many. Various theories place the blame for the assassination on Cuba, the Soviet Union, the Mafia, the CIA, the FBI, top military leaders, or Johnson himself. A 2004 Fox News poll found that 66% of Americans thought there had been a conspiracy to kill President Kennedy, while 74% thought that there had been a cover-up. A Gallup Poll in mid-November 2013, showed 61% believed in a conspiracy, and only 30% thought that Oswald did it alone. In 1979, the United States House Select Committee on Assassinations concluded that Oswald shot Kennedy, and that neither a foreign government nor a U.S. governmental institution had been involved in the shooting. However, the committee also found that there was a "high probability" that a second shooter, possibly with connections to the Mafia, had fired at Kennedy.

The assassination had an enormous impact on the American public and contributed to a growing distrust of governmental institutions. Giglio writes that Kennedy's assassination "invoked immeasurable grief," adding, "[t]o many Americans, John Kennedy's death ended an age of excellence, innocence, hope, and optimism." In 2002, historian Carl M. Brauer concluded that the public's "fascination with the assassination may indicate a psychological denial of Kennedy's death, a mass wish...to undo it."

== Historical reputation ==
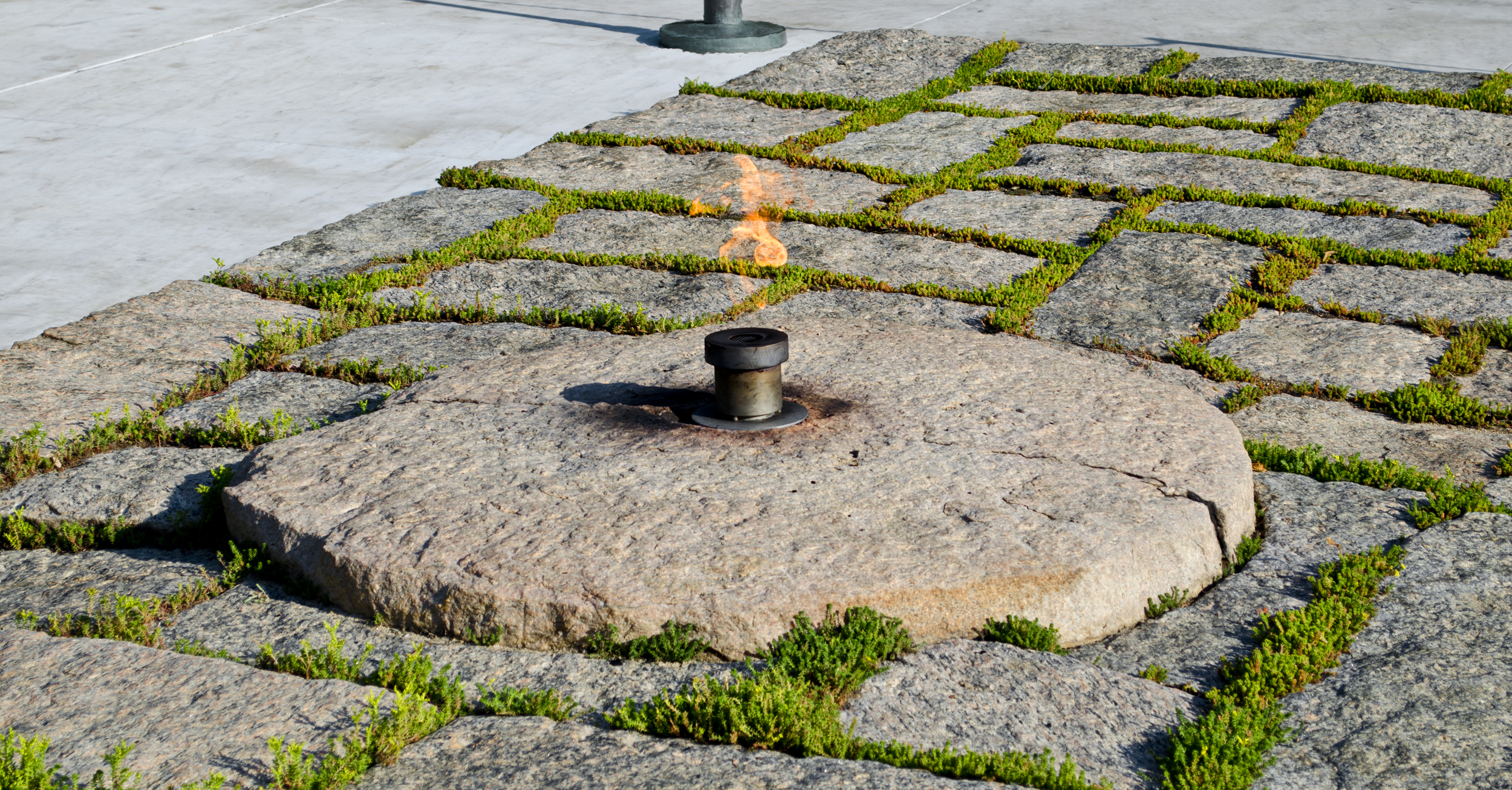
Eternal Flame at the Kennedy grave site, Arlington National Cemetery

=== Camelot ===
The term "Camelot" is often used to describe his presidency, reflecting both the mythic grandeur accorded Kennedy in death, and the powerful nostalgia that many feel for that era of American history. According to Richard Dean Burns and Joseph M. Siracusa, the most popular theme surrounding Kennedy's legacy is its replay of the legend of King Arthur and Camelot. In the days after JFK's death, his widow Jacqueline Bouvier Kennedy, who herself would play a central role in the myth, approached journalist Theodore H. White. Mrs. Kennedy emphasized an image that would shape the adoring memory of JFK and his administration, highlighting the president's love for the popular Broadway musical "Camelot". She emphasized how her husband loved the music of Alan Jay Lerner, a former classmate. Mrs. Kennedy claimed that JFK admired heroes like King Arthur, presenting him as an idealist, although White knew this to be untrue. In her attempt to convey a positive message during a tragic event, she quoted her husband as repeating the end of the "Camelot" show: said, "There will be great presidents again, but there will never be another Camelot." White's influential essay, which included the Camelot story, was published in a special commemorative issue of Life magazine on December 3, 1963, reaching over 30 million people. To the grieving public, this uplifting message seemed logical. After all, JFK, the youngest person to enter the White House, displayed intelligence, articulation, and humor. Furthermore, his young, beautiful wife, who was revered internationally, along with his famous family, made it easy to associate Kennedy with the legend of King Arthur. Later, White expressed regret for his role in popularizing the Camelot myth. Over the years, critics, especially historians, have mocked the Camelot myth as a distortion of JFK's actions, beliefs, and policies. However, in the public memory, the years of Kennedy's presidency are still seen as a brief, brilliant, and shining moment.

=== The public and the experts ===
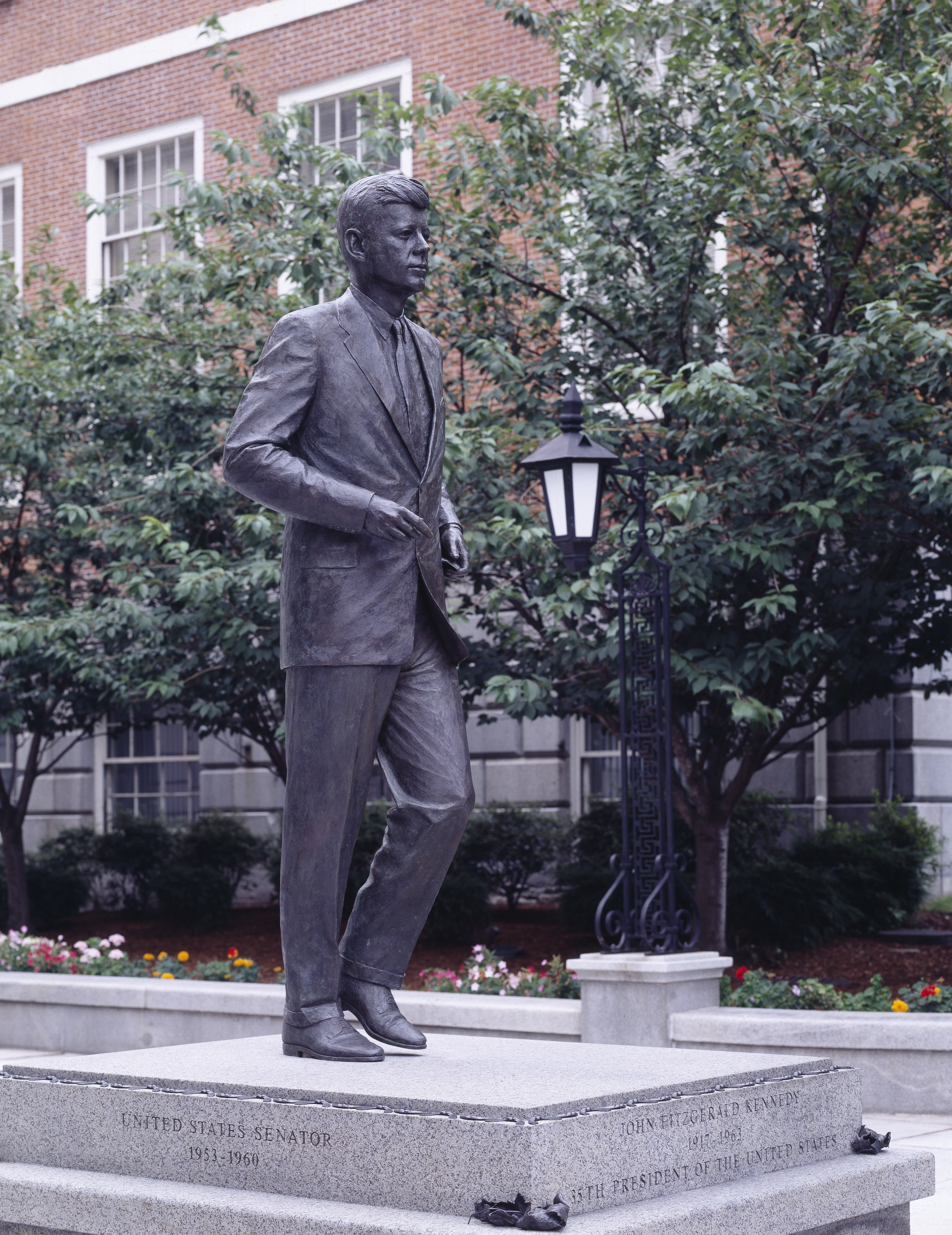
John F. Kennedy statue outside the Massachusetts State House in Boston

In public opinion Kennedy is idolized like Abraham Lincoln and Franklin D. Roosevelt; Gallup Poll surveys consistently show his public approval rating to be around 80 percent. Kennedy's legacy strongly influenced a generation of liberal Democratic leaders, including Bill Clinton, Al Gore, Michael Dukakis, and Gary Hart.

Historians and political scientists tend to rank Kennedy as an above-average president, and he is usually the highest-ranking president who served less than one full term. Assessments of his policies are mixed. The early part of his administration carried missteps highlighted by the failed Bay of Pigs invasion and the 1961 Vienna summit. The second half of his presidency was filled with several notable successes, for which he receives acclaim. He skillfully handled the Cuban Missile Crisis, as he avoided nuclear war and set the stage for a less tense era of U.S.–Soviet relations. On the other hand, his escalation of the U.S. presence in Vietnam has been criticized. Kennedy's effectiveness in domestic affairs has also been the subject of debate. Giglio notes that many of Kennedy's proposals were adopted by Congress, but his most important programs, including health insurance for the elderly, federal aid to education, and tax reform, were blocked during his presidency. Many of Kennedy's proposals were passed after his death, during the Johnson administration, and Kennedy's death gave those proposals a powerful moral component.

A 2014 Washington Post survey of 162 members of the American Political Science Association's Presidents and Executive Politics section ranked Kennedy 14th highest overall among the 43 persons who have been president, including then-president Barack Obama. Then among the "modern presidents", the thirteen from Franklin Roosevelt through Obama, he places in the middle of the pack. The survey also found Kennedy to be the most overrated U.S. president. A 2017 C-SPAN survey has Kennedy ranked among the top ten presidents of all time. The survey asked 91 presidential historians to rank the 43 former presidents (including then-president Barack Obama) in various categories to come up with a composite score, resulting in an overall ranking. Kennedy was ranked 8th among all former presidents (down from 6th in 2009). His rankings in the various categories of this most recent poll were as follows: public persuasion (6), crisis leadership (7), economic management (7), moral authority (15), international relations (14), administrative skills (15), relations with congress (12), vision/setting an agenda (9), pursued equal justice for all (7), performance with context of times (9). A 2018 poll of the American Political Science Association's Presidents and Executive Politics section ranked Kennedy as the 16th best president.

==== Worst mistake ====
A 2006 poll of historians ranked Kennedy's decision to authorize the Bay of Pigs invasion as the eighth-worst mistake made by any American president.

=== U.S. Special Forces ===
The U.S. Special Forces had a special bond with Kennedy. "It was President Kennedy who was responsible for the rebuilding of the Special Forces and giving us back our Green Beret," said Forrest Lindley, a writer for the U.S. military newspaper Stars and Stripes who served with Special Forces in Vietnam. (Note: Kennedy reversed the Defense Department rulings that prohibited the Special Forces wearing of the Green Beret. Reeves 1993, p. 116.) This bond was shown at Kennedy's funeral. At the commemoration of the 25th anniversary of Kennedy's death, General Michael D. Healy, the last commander of Special Forces in Vietnam, spoke at Arlington National Cemetery. Later, a wreath in the form of the Green Beret would be placed on the grave, continuing a tradition that began the day of his funeral when a sergeant in charge of a detail of Special Forces men guarding the grave placed his beret on the coffin. Kennedy was the first of six presidents to have served in the U.S. Navy, and one of the enduring legacies of his administration was the creation in 1961 of another special forces command, the Navy SEALs, which Kennedy enthusiastically supported.
