= Foreign policy of the Kennedy administration =

The United States foreign policy during the presidency of John F. Kennedy from 1961 to 1963 included diplomatic and military initiatives in Western Europe, Southeast Asia, and Latin America, all conducted amid considerable Cold War tensions with the Soviet Union and its satellite states in Eastern Europe. Kennedy deployed a new generation of foreign policy experts, dubbed "the best and the brightest". In his inaugural address Kennedy encapsulated his Cold War stance: "Let us never negotiate out of fear. But let us never fear to negotiate". His inaugural address also indirectly addressed the Soviet Union by saying that he would 'oppose any foe to assure the survival and the success of liberty.'

Kennedy's strategy of flexible response, managed by Defense Secretary Robert McNamara, was aimed to reduce the possibility of war by miscalculation. His administration resulted in the peaceful resolution of the Cuban Missile Crisis and refrained from further escalation of the Berlin Crisis of 1961. However, Kennedy's policies also led to implementing the Bay of Pigs invasion and escalation of the Vietnam War.

Kennedy was committed to the rapid economic development of the newly organized nations in Africa and Asia. He used modernization theory as the model to follow, and created the Alliance for Progress, the Peace Corps, Food for Peace, and the Agency for International Development (AID). After the near escape from disaster in the Cuban Missile Crisis, he promoted disarmament and disengagement programs with Moscow, and created the Arms Control and Disarmament Agency. In October, 1963, he signed into law the Partial Nuclear Test Ban Treaty, which was accepted by Moscow and London.

== Leadership team ==
=== Appointments ===
Kennedy's 1962 foreign policy team

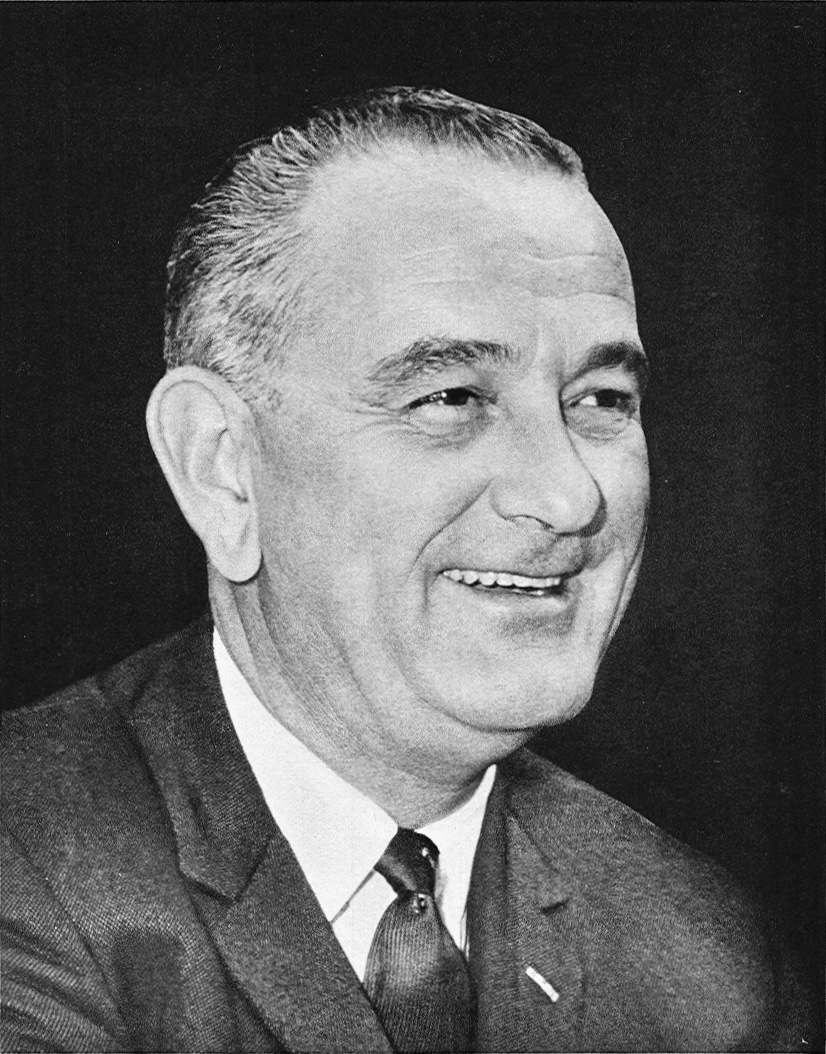
Lyndon B. Johnson

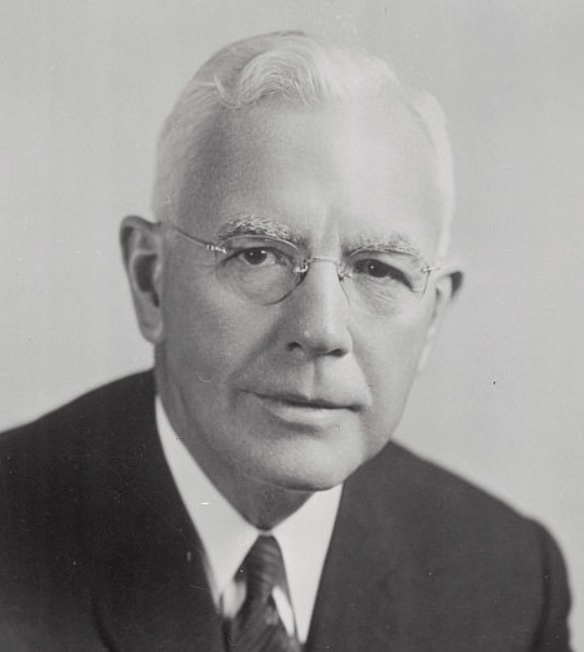
John A. McCone

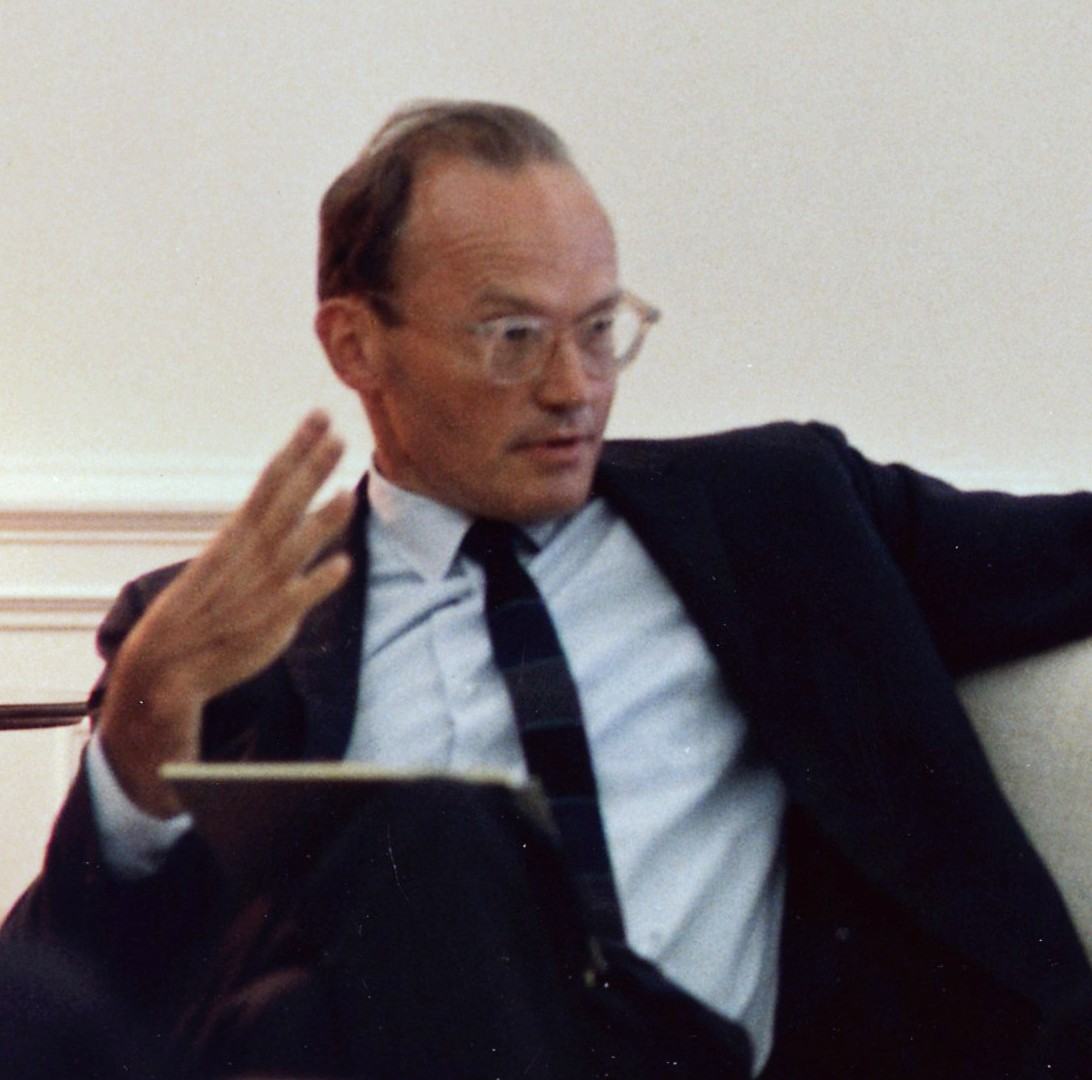
McGeorge Bundy

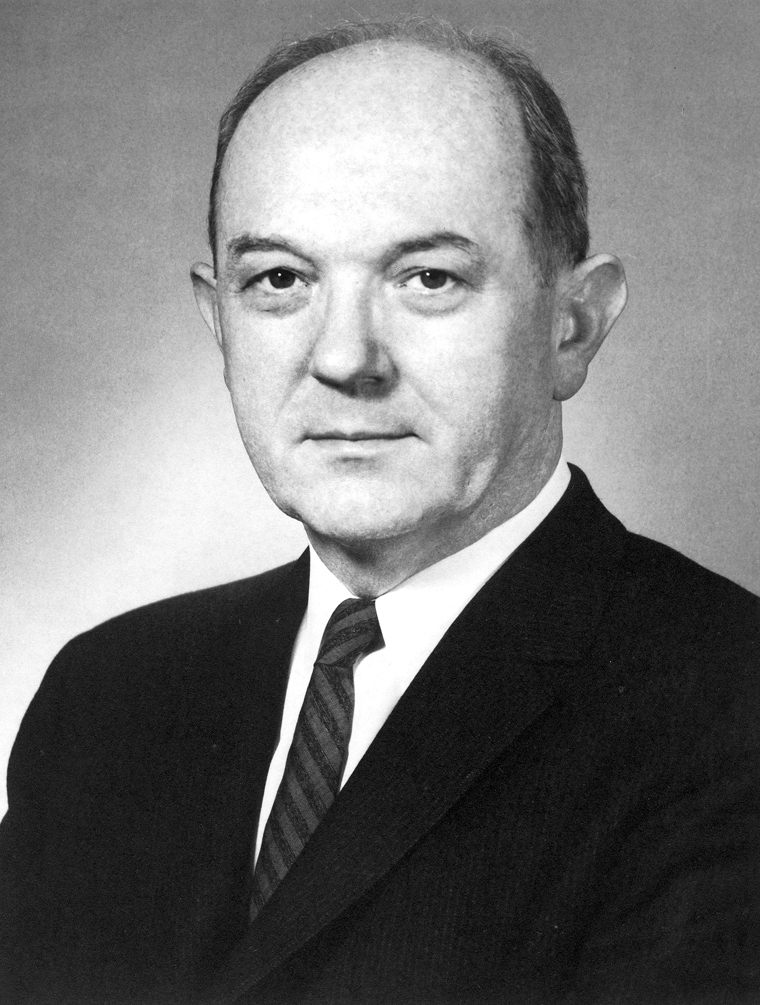
Dean Rusk

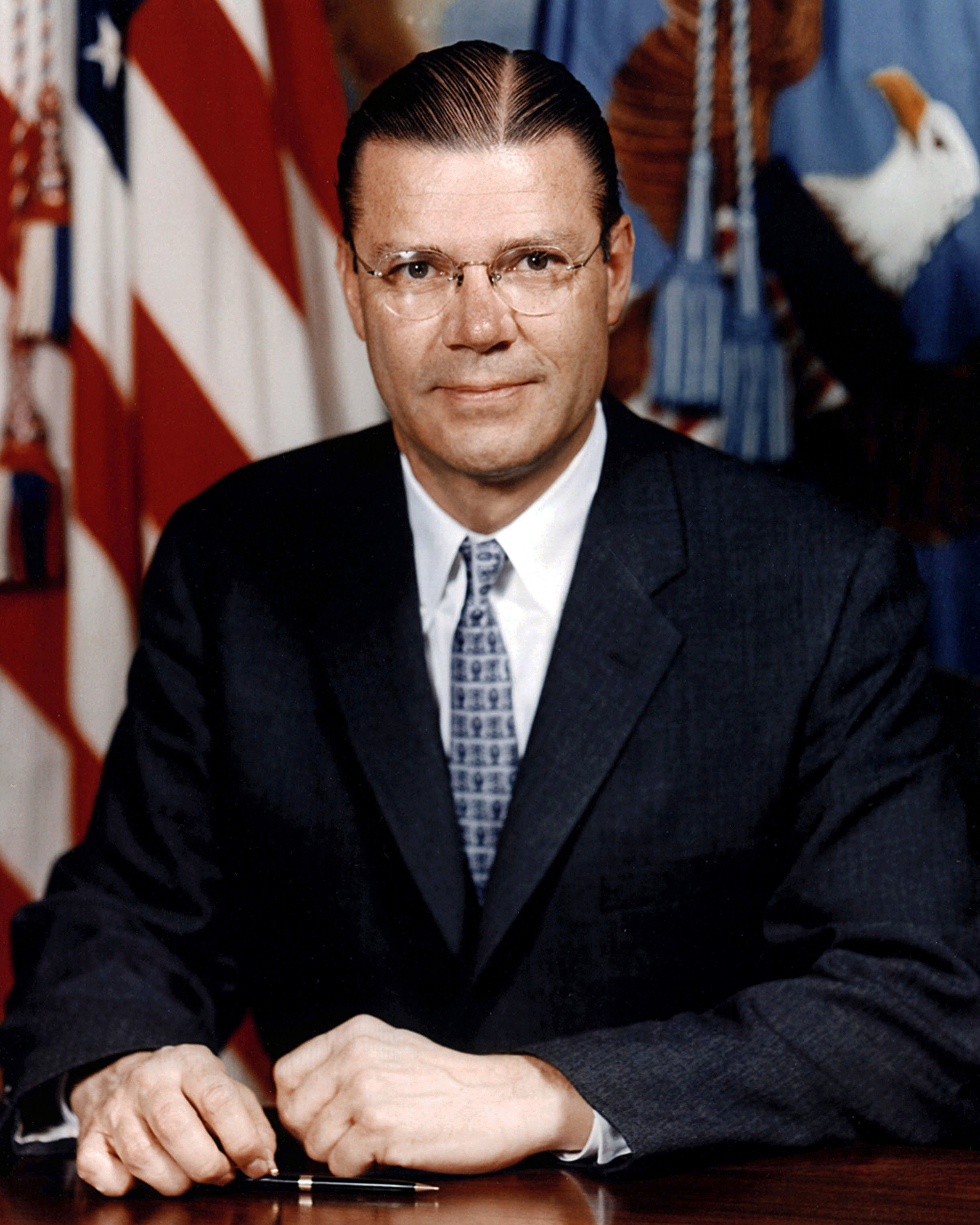
Robert McNamara

From election day until late December 1960, Kennedy, aided especially by his brother Robert F. Kennedy, selected his foreign policy leaders. He kept a few prominent holdovers, including J. Edgar Hoover at the FBI and Allen Dulles as Director of Central Intelligence. C. Douglas Dillon, a Republican who had served as Eisenhower's Undersecretary of State was named Secretary of the Treasury. Robert McNamara, who was well known as one of Ford Motor Company's "Whiz Kids", was appointed Secretary of Defense. Rejecting liberal pressure to choose Adlai Stevenson as Secretary of State, and ignoring the powerful senator from Arkansas J. William Fulbright, the president instead turned to Dean Rusk, a restrained former Truman official. Stevenson accepted the mostly honorific appointment as the ambassador to the United Nations. Robert Kennedy was selected as Attorney General, and the younger Kennedy was often referred to as the "assistant president" in reference to his wide range of influence.

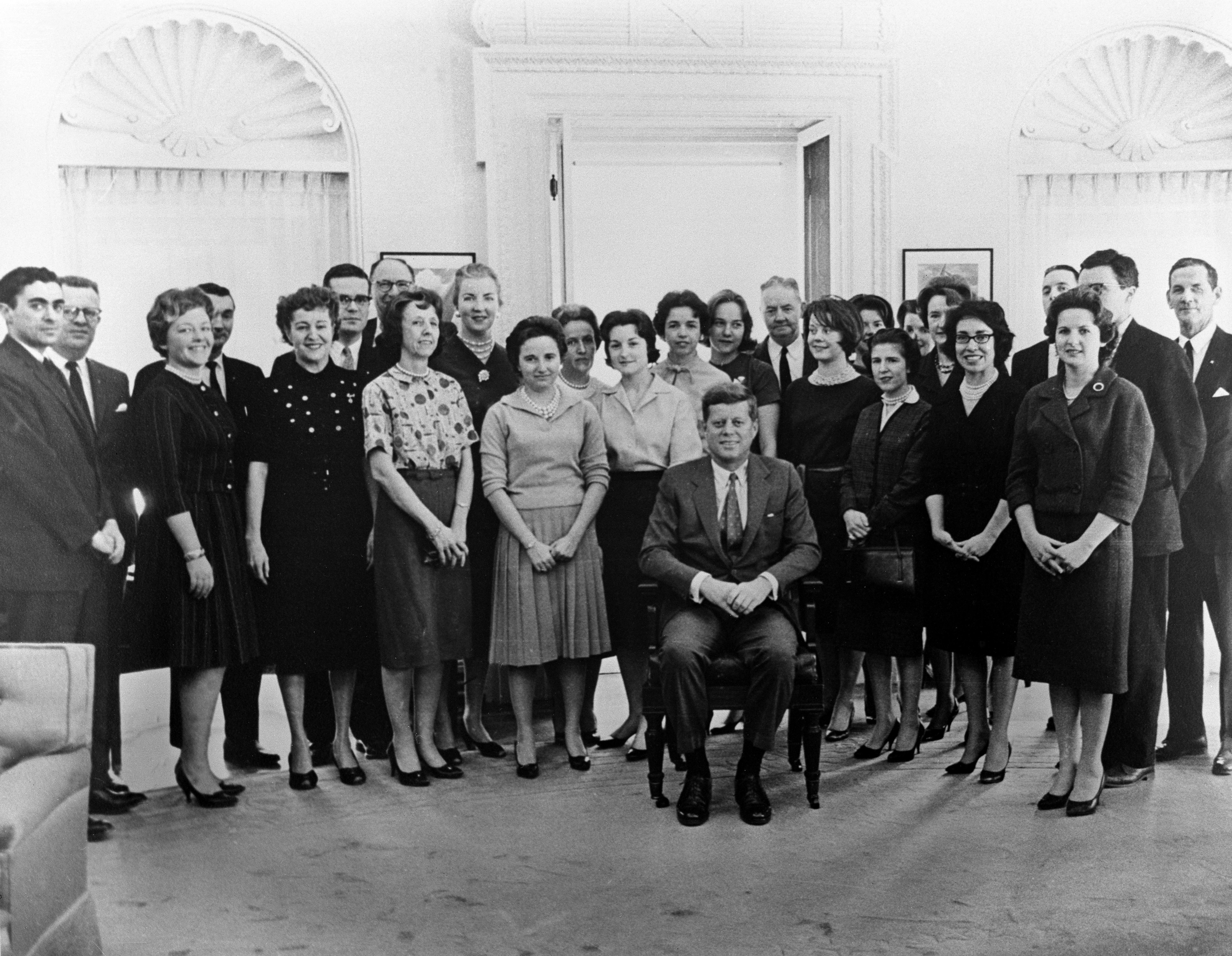
President John F. Kennedy (seated) with members of his White House staff

Kennedy generally assigned the State Department to handle routine issues while major foreign policy decisions were handled in the White House. The President's own reputation was built largely on his knowledge of world affairs, going back to his senior thesis at Harvard on British foreign policy in the 1930s. Kennedy found it very difficult to get domestic legislation through a Democratic Congress, but discovered that he could make significant decisions on foreign policy without consulting Congress. He set up the Peace Corps by Executive Order, and put his brother-in-law in charge. The national security council staff, which did not need Senate approval, became a little State Department, and was headed by National Security Advisor McGeorge Bundy, a Harvard professor. Other key White House aides included speechwriter Ted Sorensen, and advisers Arthur M. Schlesinger Jr., press secretary Pierre Salinger, military expert General Maxwell D. Taylor, and party leader W. Averell Harriman. Vice President Johnson had a minimal role in foreign policy; instead he was sent abroad on many ceremonial visits.

=== CIA intelligence and espionage ===
The credibility of the CIA was wounded at the Bay of Pigs. In the aftermath Kennedy issued two National Security Action Memoranda (no. 55 and 57) which redefined the CIA role. Memorandum 55 stated that it was the Joint Chiefs of Staff who had the "responsibility for the defense of the nation in the Cold War" and memorandum 57 restricted the CIA's paramilitary operations by stating "Any large paramilitary operation wholly or partly covert which requires significant numbers of militarily trained personnel, amounts of military equipment which exceed normal CIA-controlled stocks and/or military experience of a kind and level peculiar to the Armed Services is properly the primary responsibility of the Department of Defense with the CIA in a supporting role". In October 1961 Kennedy created the Defense Intelligence Agency, the purpose of which was to institutionalize the revoking of the CIA's paramilitary and other duties, and their transfer to the Department of Defense. He also forced the resignations of the three highest ranking CIA men, Allen Dulles (Director), Charles Cabell (Deputy Director), and Richard M. Bissell Jr. (Deputy Director for Plans).

Kennedy was deeply depressed and angered with the Bay of Pigs failure. He confided to Arthur Schlesinger Jr. that "I have learned one thing from this business—that is, that we have to deal with CIA... no one has dealt with CIA" and several years after his death, The New York Times reported that he told an unspecified high administration official of wanting "to splinter the CIA in a thousand pieces and scatter it to the winds". Ultimately, The New York Times reported that "after the most rigorous inquiry into the agency's affairs, methods and problems after the Bay of Pigs, [Kennedy] did not 'splinter' it after all and did not recommend Congressional supervision." Schlesinger writes that the failure of the invasion "stimulated a wide variety of proposals for the reorganization of the CIA" within the Kennedy administration.

== Communist states ==
The communist world under Soviet leadership split up in the Kennedy era, with the Soviet Union and China increasingly at swords point. The American strategy was to strongly oppose China, fearing that it had the greater potential to win support in the Third World. Kennedy saw an opportunity to deal with Moscow on friendlier terms.

=== The Cold War and flexible response ===
Kennedy's foreign policy was dominated by American confrontations with the Soviet Union, manifested by proxy contests in the global state of the Cold War. Like his two predecessors, Kennedy adopted the policy of containment, which purported to stop the spread of Communism. President Eisenhower's New Look policy had emphasized the use of nuclear weapons to deter the threat of Soviet aggression. Fearful of the possibility of a global nuclear war, Kennedy implemented a new strategy known as flexible response. This strategy relied on conventional arms to achieve limited goals. As part of this policy, Kennedy expanded the United States special operations forces, elite military units that could fight unconventionally in various conflicts. Kennedy hoped that the flexible response strategy would allow the U.S. to counter Soviet influence without resorting to war. At the same time, he ordered a massive build-up of the nuclear arsenal to establish superiority over the Soviet Union.

In pursuing this military build-up, Kennedy shifted away from Eisenhower's deep concern for budget deficits caused by military spending. In his 1960 presidential race, Kennedy strongly criticized Eisenhower's inadequate spending on defense. In his inaugural address he promised “to bear any burden” in the defense of liberty, and he repeatedly asked for increases in military spending and authorization of new weapon systems. From 1961 to 1964 the number of nuclear weapons increased by 50 percent, as did the number of B-52 bombers to deliver them. The new ICBM force grew from 63 intercontinental ballistic missiles to 424. He authorized 23 new Polaris submarines, each of which carried 16 nuclear missiles. He called on cities to prepare fallout shelters for nuclear war. In contrast to Eisenhower's warning about the perils of the military–industrial complex, Kennedy focused on rearmament. He gave the Pentagon a global reach, with 275 major bases in 31 countries, with 1.2 million personnel stationed there. Kennedy used the military as a political instrument more often than any other postwar president, with 13 episodes a year compared to four a year under Truman; seven per year for Eisenhower; nine per year for Johnson; and five per year for Nixon and Ford.

=== Soviet Union ===
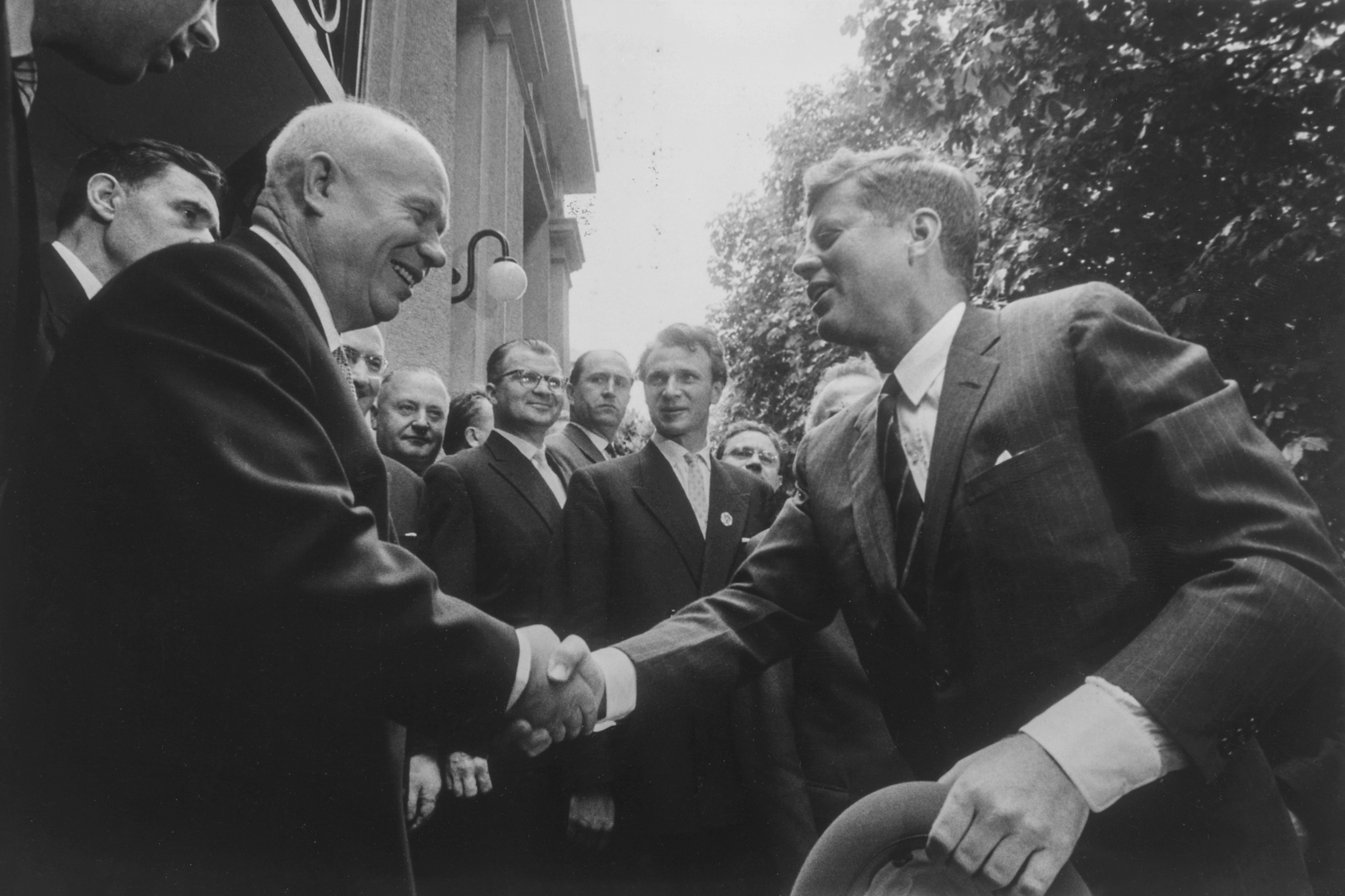
Kennedy shaking hands with Nikita Khrushchev, 1961.

On November 29, 1961, American officials declared that the Telegraph Agency of the Soviet Union (TASS) allegedly distributed a distorted, editorialized version of the Kennedy interview, given to Izvestiya employee Alexei Adzhubey. According to U.S. officials, the omissions included Kennedy's charges that the Soviets had violated the Yalta and Potsdam agreements, as well as the moratorium on nuclear tests and his claim that the issue of divided Berlin largely stems from the Soviet refusal to agree to German reunification. Adzhubey promised to publish the full text in Izvestiya and Kennedy publicly expressed his appreciation for that.

In January 1961, Soviet leader Nikita Khrushchev declared his support for wars of national liberation. Kennedy interpreted this step as a direct threat to the "free world". On February 15, 1961, the President asked Soviets to avoid interfering with United Nations pacification role in the Congo Crisis. Khrushchev proposed to amend the United Nations Charter by replacing the position of Secretary-General with a three-person executive called the Troyka (Russian: "group of three"). On September 25, 1961, Kennedy addressed the United Nations General Assembly, revealing his commitment to veto the Troyka plan. On February 27 of that year, in his letter to Khrushchev, the President offered an early summit meeting. Khrushchev agreed to meet in Vienna. The subsequent Vienna summit was tainted by the Bay of Pigs Invasion. Khrushchev, however, tended to attribute the responsibility for the invasion not to Kennedy, but to his subordinates.

During his meeting with Khrushchev, Kennedy's main goal was to suggest a retraction from the Cold War. Nonetheless, he did not believe that it would be feasible to change something either in divided Europe or in the Far East. Subsequently, he spoke with very general wording. However, Kennedy did take the novel step of emphasizing the importance of Allied access to West Berlin. Previous administrations had simply referred to "Berlin." The evidence suggests that Kennedy essentially accepted the permanent division of Berlin into East and West and implied that an East Berlin border closure would not bring a US response as long as West Berlin was left alone. Since he was already thinking about putting up a wall in Berlin, Khrushchev was encouraged to continue down this path.

The U.S. State Department prepared several papers for Kennedy on how to approach Khrushchev. One of them, titled "Scope Paper", indicated that Khrushchev would "undoubtedly press hard his position on Berlin and a peace treaty with East Germany". In spring 1963, Kennedy started to seek a further conciliation with the Soviet Union. In the summer of that year, he sought to wind down the confrontational mentality that dominated American–Soviet relations and to replace standard anticommunist rhetoric with a conciliatory one.

=== Test Ban Treaty ===
Abstract: On 10 June 1963 Kennedy gave a speech that facilitated a major agreement with Moscow Partial Nuclear Test Ban Treaty. It helped avoid a nuclear holocaust, since the nuclear confrontation was not then a stable balance of terror, but rather a highly unstable situation that was prone to accidents, misjudgements and escalating disaster. Presidential leadership played a decisive role. Following the Cuban Missile Crisis, Kennedy saw that only he could find the terms that would be accepted by Khrushchev nuclear war. The result was peace diplomacy that led to his collaboration with Khrushchev that succeeded in pulling the superpowers back from the brink. Khrushchev called it, "the best speech by any president since Roosevelt."

=== China ===
Before the Cuban missile crisis, policymakers in Washington were uncertain whether or not China would break with the Soviet Union on the basis of ideology, national ambitions, and readiness for a role in guiding communist activities in many countries. New insight came with the Sino-Indian border war in November 1962 and Beijing's response to the Cuban Missile Crisis. Kennedy administration officials concluded that China was more militant and more dangerous than the Soviet Union, making better relations with Moscow desirable, with both nations trying to contain Chinese ambitions. Diplomatic recognition of China remained out of the question, as a crucial veto power on the UN Security Council was held by America's ally on Taiwan.

Tensions escalated between Moscow and Beijing, as Chinese leader Mao Zedong castigated Khrushchev's "capitulation" in the Cuban crisis. With a partial thaw in relations between the United States and the Soviet Union, China emerged as the biggest Cold War enemy in Kennedy's rhetoric. To rally support at home for his "Great Leap Forward", Mao deliberately made the United States a highly visible enemy, and focused even more hostility against India, to the point of low-level 33-day war along their long border in late 1962. The United States supported India, ignoring India's long-standing commitment to Moscow. India realized it needed American financial help and munitions so Prime Minister Jawaharlal Nehru in August 1963, wrote Kennedy explaining the challenges India faced from China and Pakistan. Nehru indicated his agreement with the American position when he warned that the Chinese were:

making a bid for leadership not only in Asia but of the Communist world and this too only as a first step in their bid for world leadership....The Chinese want people in Afro-Asian and Latin American countries to adopt militant, aggressive and revolutionary attitudes and are against democratic evolutionary practices and stable regimes.

=== Cuba ===
==== Missile Crisis ====
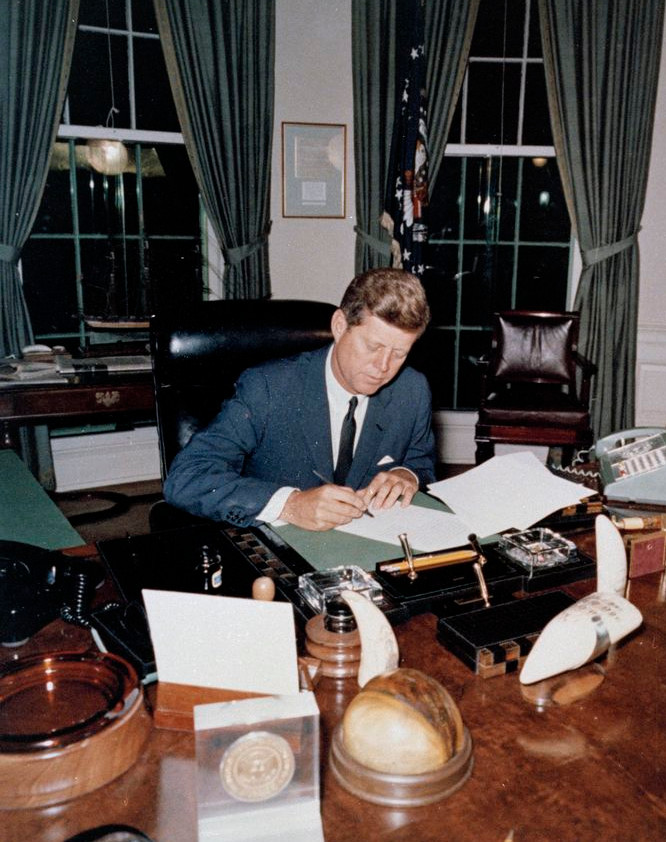
Kennedy, signing the authorization of the naval quarantine of Cuba.

After the ill-fated Bay of Pigs Invasion, in late July 1962, the Soviet Union began sending its weaponry and military personnel to Cuba, citing the intents to protect Cuba from further invasions. The Soviet Union planned to allocate in Cuba 49 medium-range ballistic missiles, 32 intermediate-range ballistic missiles, 49 light Il-28 bombers and about 100 tactical nuclear weapons.

After their discovery Kennedy secretly met with the EXCOMM. He postponed a military solution of the crisis strenuously advocated by the Joint Chiefs of Staff, and decided to impose a naval quarantine on Cuba. On October 22, 1962 Kennedy informed the nation of the crisis, announcing the quarantine and demanding the removal of Soviet missiles.

Kennedy managed to preserve restraint when a Soviet missile unauthorizedly downed a US Lockheed U-2 reconnaissance aircraft over Cuba, killing the pilot Rudolf Anderson. On October 27, in a letter to Nikita Khrushchev, Kennedy offered a noninvasion pledge for the removal of missiles from Cuba. The next day Kennedy and Khrushchev struck a deal: the Soviet Union agreed to remove the missiles in exchange for the United States' noninvasion pledge and the dismantlement of US PGM-19 Jupiter missiles based in Italy and Turkey. By that time, the fifteen Jupiter missiles were considered obsolete and had been supplanted by missile-equipped US Navy Polaris subs. They were removed the next year.

During the crisis Kennedy showed his leadership talents, decision-making abilities and crisis management skills. By early November 1962 Kennedy's handling of the Cuban Missile Crisis was considered by most Americans as a diplomatic success in foreign policy.

==== Diplomatic talks ====
In 1963 Kennedy and Castro began shuttle diplomacy to discuss detente. Some wanted a Cuban break with the USSR as a condition for any agreement, however Kennedy disagreed, preferring "a more flexible approach" as "we don't want to present Castro with a condition that he obviously cannot fulfil". Under Kennedy's direction William Attwood had discussions with the Cuban UN ambassador in New York.

In the days before Kennedy's assassination he told the French journalist Jean Daniel in a White House meeting, to send a message to Castro that he was willing to lift the economic embargo against Cuba so long as the Cuban government stopped supporting leftist revolutionary movements throughout Latin America. Around this time he had also made a speech to the Inter-American Press Association where he suggested that normalization of relations with Cuba was possible.

== Europe ==
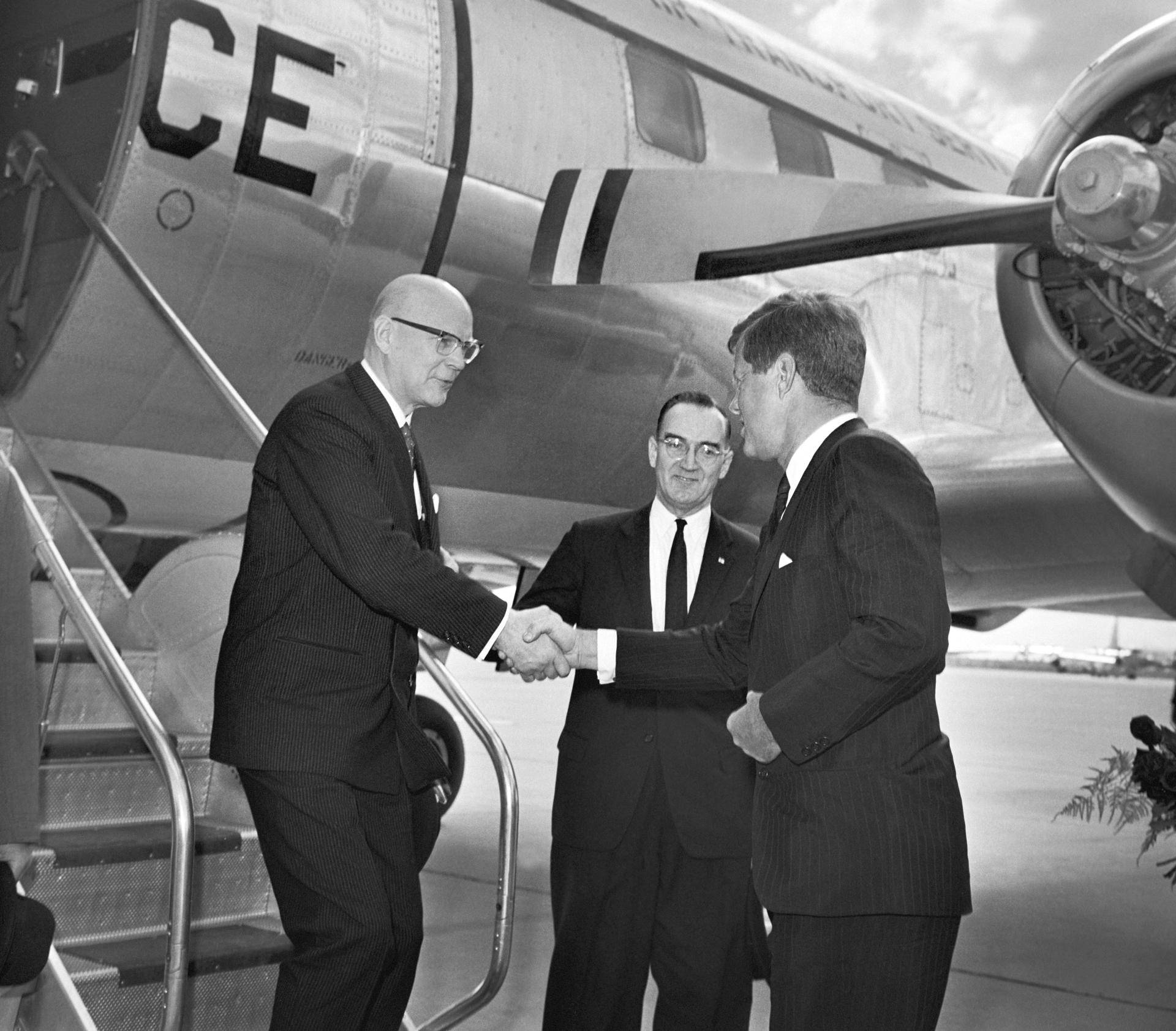
Urho Kekkonen, the President of Finland, arriving to the United States and being welcomed by President Kennedy on 16 October 1961.

The NATO alliance was the main link to Europe. It contained Soviet expansion to the west, and kept the United States involved in European affairs while preventing West Germany or France from becoming too powerful. London was a strong supporter of Washington's central role.

=== Multipolarity In Europe ===
The United States and the Soviet Union had retained firm leadership of their respective coalitions throughout the 1950s, but both blocs began to fracture during Kennedy's term. President Charles de Gaulle vetoed Britain's application to join the Common Market (European Economic Community) in January 1963 after appearing receptive to the idea just months earlier. De Gaulle pointed to the risk of a loss of cohesion in Common Market and the need to Maintain independence from the United States. He distrusted British intentions in Europe. His chief reason was Britain's deal with the U.S. through NATO involving Polaris nuclear missile technology. De Gaulle wanted a strong Europe free of any dependence on the United States, while Harold Macmillan and other British leaders considered their country's "special relationship" with the United States more important to its future. In 1963, France and West Germany signed the Élysée Treaty, marking even closer relations between the two countries. De Gaulle also rejected Kennedy's proposed Multilateral Force in favor of an independent nuclear weapons program.

=== United Kingdom ===
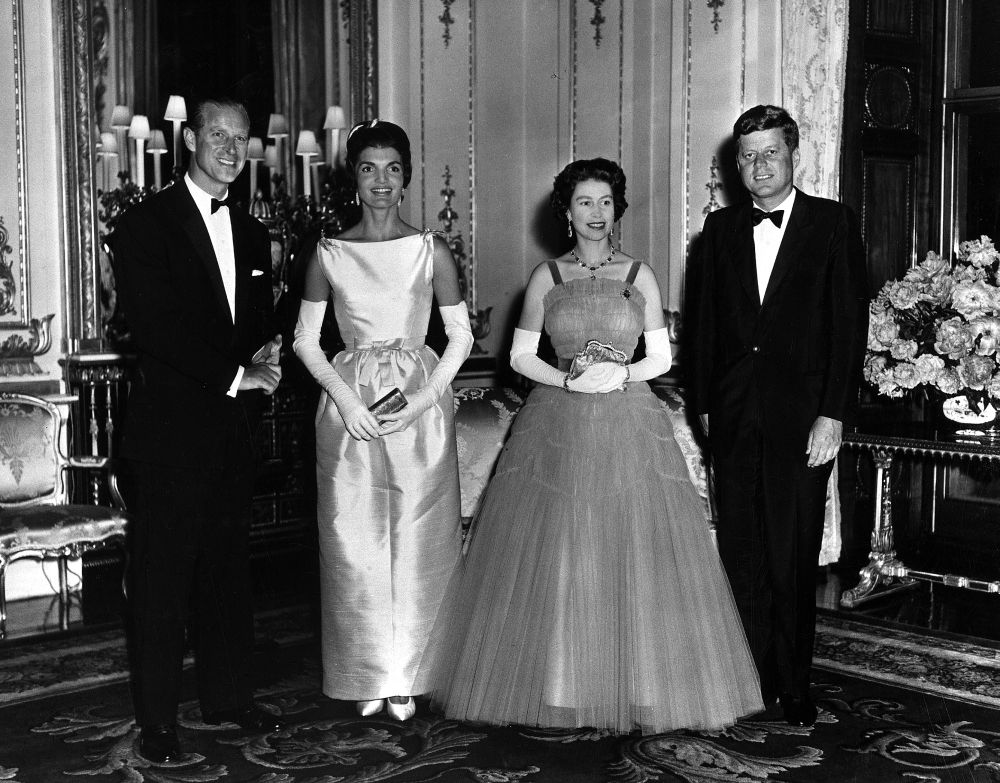
President and Mrs. Kennedy with The Queen and The Duke of Edinburgh at Buckingham Palace in 1961

By 1960, the United Kingdom had ceased their work on a national missile system and Eisenhower offered to make the American GAM-87 Skybolt available to the British as soon as it was improved. The United Kingdom accepted the offer as the GAM-87 Skybolt would have ensured it a nuclear deterrent through most of the 1960s. By mid-1962, however, US Defense Secretary Robert McNamara had deemed the Skybolt project "excessively expensive... with serious technical flaws" and decided to cancel it.

Due to informational mishaps, President Kennedy was not informed that McNamara's decision would have serious political consequences for Harold Macmillan's government. At a meeting with Macmillan, the President attempted to save the situation and offered the United Kingdom the UGM-27 Polaris in lieu of Skybolt. The related agreement dissatisfied French President Charles De Gaulle, who resented American preference toward Great Britain.

=== Portugal ===
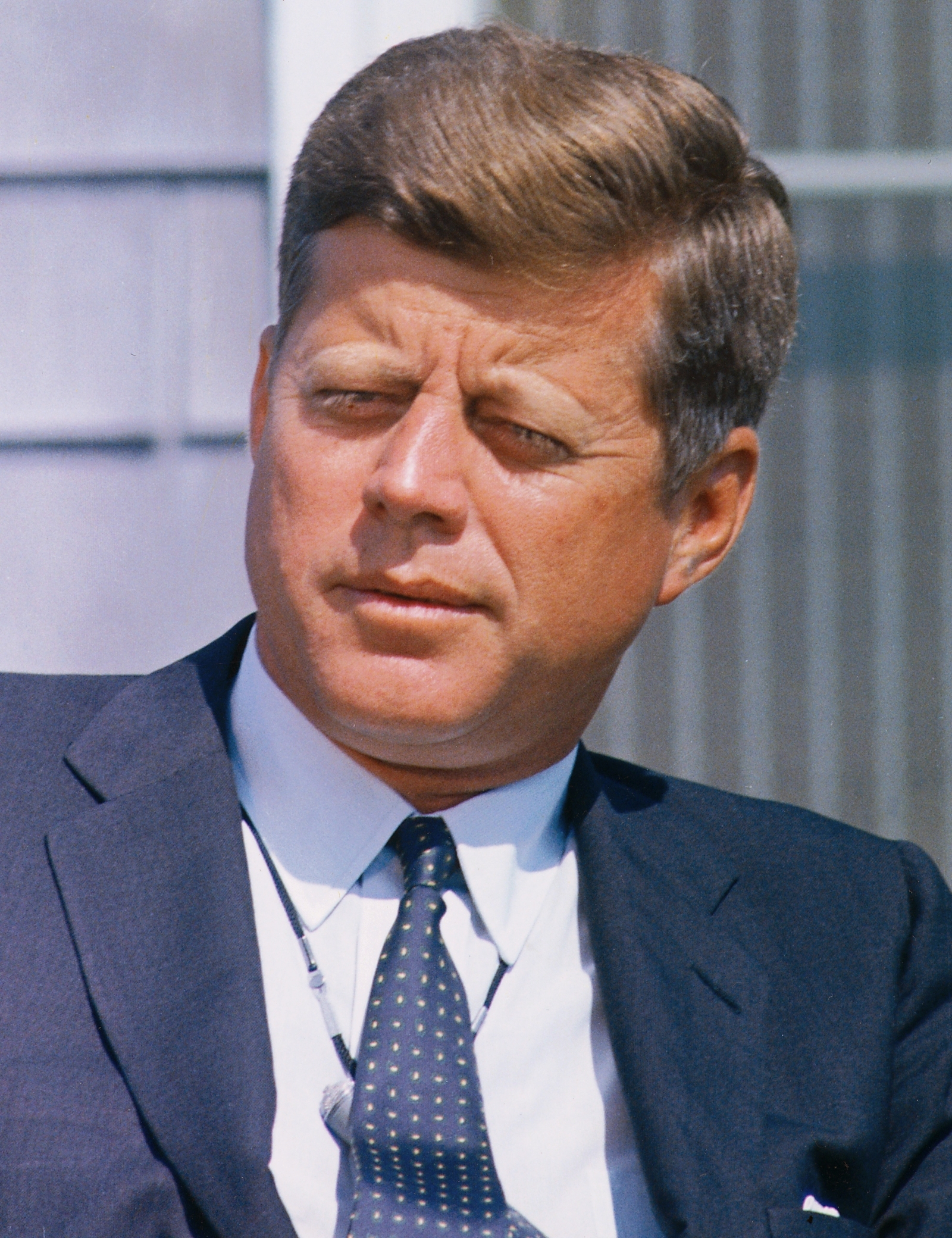
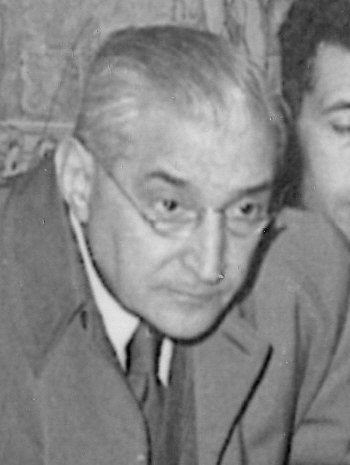
US President John F. Kennedy (left) and prime-minister of Portugal António de Oliveira Salazar (right).

During the Kennedy Administration, there was a shift in their stance on European colonialism, favoring support for African self-determination. This led to increased engagement with Angolan nationalist groups, particularly the UPA led by Holden Roberto. The administration also implemented a new arms policy towards Portugal in August 1961. They refused to supply military equipment for uses outside of NATO, effectively blocking its deployment in Africa. President Kennedy advised António de Oliveira Salazar, the Portuguese dictator, to reconsider Portugal's hold on its African territories.

While eager to push their stance on Portuguese colonial policy in Angola, the U.S. couldn't overlook their strategic military base in the Azores. They risked antagonizing Portugal, potentially jeopardizing the base's contract renewal. This dispute was resolved by mid-1962, after President Kennedy listened to the arguments made by the Pentagon and proponents for European interests. The anti-Portuguese policies of 1961 gradually shifted towards a more pro-Portuguese position.

Despite initial sympathies towards African rebel groups, Kennedy acknowledged the critical importance of the Azores base for U.S. national security and overseas military presence.

=== France ===
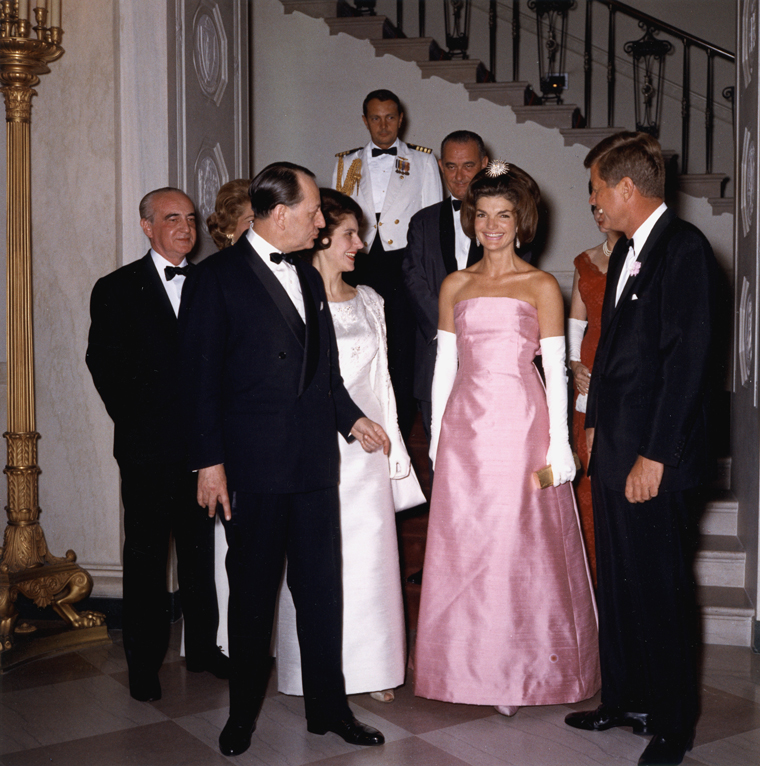
Kennedy at a White House dinner in honor of the French Minister of Cultural Affairs André Malraux, 1962.

France was the second country that Kennedy visited as president. He arrived to Paris with his wife Jacqueline Kennedy on May 31, 1961. French President Charles De Gaulle, known for his preference to speak French to foreign guests, greeted Kennedy in English. Jacqueline, who in turn spoke fluent French, intrigued the French press, which called her the "queen".

The French nuclear program was pivotal in De Gaulle's aim of restoring France's international reputation. Kennedy administration had a firm commitment to the nuclear nonproliferation. In a letter to Harold Macmillan, Kennedy wrote: "After careful review of the problem, I have to come to the conclusion that it would be undesirable to assist France's efforts to create a nuclear weapons capability". Kennedy was particularly dissatisfied with De Gaulle's intentions to assist West Germany in developing nuclear weapons.

=== East and West Germany ===
President Kennedy called Berlin "the great testing place of Western courage and will". On August 13, 1961, the East Germans, backed by Moscow, suddenly erected a temporary barbed wire barricade and then a concrete barrier, dividing Berlin. Kennedy noted that "it seem[ed] particularly stupid to risk killing millions of Americans... because Germans want[ed] Germany to be reunified".

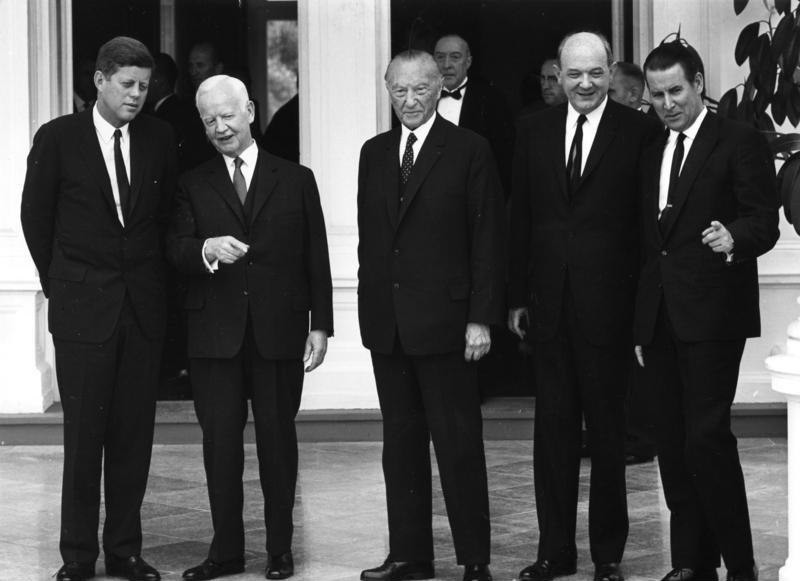
Kennedy with the Chancellor of West Germany Konrad Adenauer (center) in Bonn, 1963.

Two months later, a US-Soviet war nearly occurred as US and Soviet tanks faced off across Checkpoint Charlie. The crisis was defused largely through a backchannel communication the Kennedy administration had set up with Soviet spy Georgi Bolshakov.

As a result of the Berlin crisis, Kennedy's government faced a dramatic increase in the defense budget. The negative balance of payments with the European allies had aggravated American fiscal problems. In late-1961, US Defense Secretary McNamara concluded an arrangement with West Germany whereby the latter was to annually purchase some American military hardware. However, this only partially alleviated the payments issue.

On June 26, 1963, the President arrived in West Berlin and visited Checkpoint Charlie. That day, he delivered his famous "Ich bin ein Berliner" speech in front of 150,000 West Germans. In remarks to his aides on the Berlin Wall, Kennedy noted that the wall "is a hell of a lot better than a war".

Kennedy ordered 500 military men to travel on trucks through East Germany to West Berlin to ensure that the West preserved the land-link to the city. In late October 1961, a dispute over the right of one U.S. diplomat to cross East Berlin flared into conflict. Soviet and American tanks faced one another at Checkpoint Charlie, but Kennedy through an intermediary offered Khrushchev a conciliatory formula and both superpowers withdrew their tanks.

=== Yugoslavia ===
Under Kennedy's administration George F. Kennan served as ambassador. By 1962, Congress had passed legislation to deny financial aid grants to Yugoslavia, to withdraw the sale of spare parts for Yugoslav warplanes, and to revoke the country's most favored nation status. Kennan strongly protested the legislation, arguing that it would only result in a straining of relations between Yugoslavia and the U.S. Kennan came to Washington during the summer of 1962 to lobby against the legislation but was unable to elicit a change from Congress. President Kennedy endorsed Kennan privately but remained noncommittal publicly, as he did not want to jeopardize his slim majority support in Congress on a potentially contentious issue.

In October 1963 Josip Tito, the President of Yugoslavia, visited the White House upon invitation by President Kennedy. This was a highly controversial visit, with the House and the Senate passing resolutions in opposition.

== Asia and Middle East ==
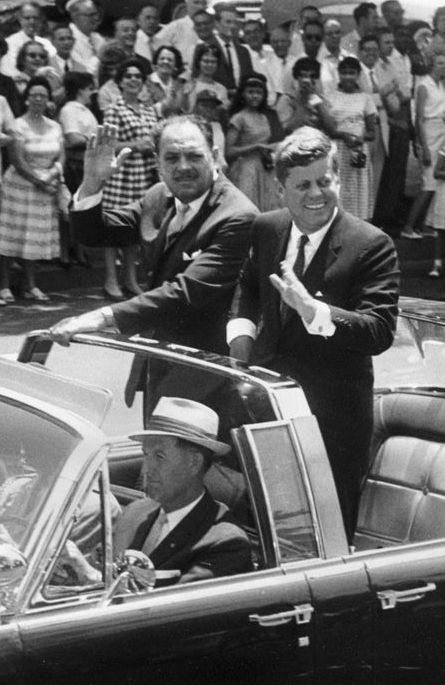
Kennedy with President of Pakistan Ayub Khan.

=== India ===
Kennedy's Asian initiatives particularly targeted India, as it followed a noncommunist model of economic development and was a member of the Nonaligned Movement.

=== Indonesia ===
Kennedy sought to improve relations with Indonesia’s government led by Sukarno. Sukarno had frequently expressed anti-American views and Kennedy remarked that in light of CIA activities in Indonesia these attitudes were understandable. Kennedy feared that poor US-Indonesian relations would increase Soviet influence in the country. Indonesia also had hosted the Bandung Conference, a key event in the formation of the Nonaligned Movement; Kennedy sought to change course from his predecessor, President Eisenhower, by engaging nonaligned countries as part of his Cold War strategy.

Kennedy's administration also sought to covertly bolster the influence of the army in Indonesia, viewing it as a potential bulwark against communism. Advised by General Maxwell Taylor and Howard Jones, the ambassador to Indonesia, Kennedy believed that spurring the army to support (especially rural) civilian reconstruction and development would help the often unpopular Indonesian army endear itself to the Indonesian people.

In April 1961 Sukarno visited the White House, becoming the first foreign head of state to visit during Kennedy’s presidency. To mitigate the influence of Soviet aid, Kennedy proposed that the U.S. support Sukarno in forming an economic development plan following the visit. Kennedy helped mediate the West New Guinea dispute, convincing Indonesia and the Netherlands to agree to a plebiscite to determine the status of Dutch New Guinea. Ultimately West New Guinea was transferred to Indonesia. Before his assassination Kennedy planned to visit Indonesia in 1964.

=== Israel and Arab states ===
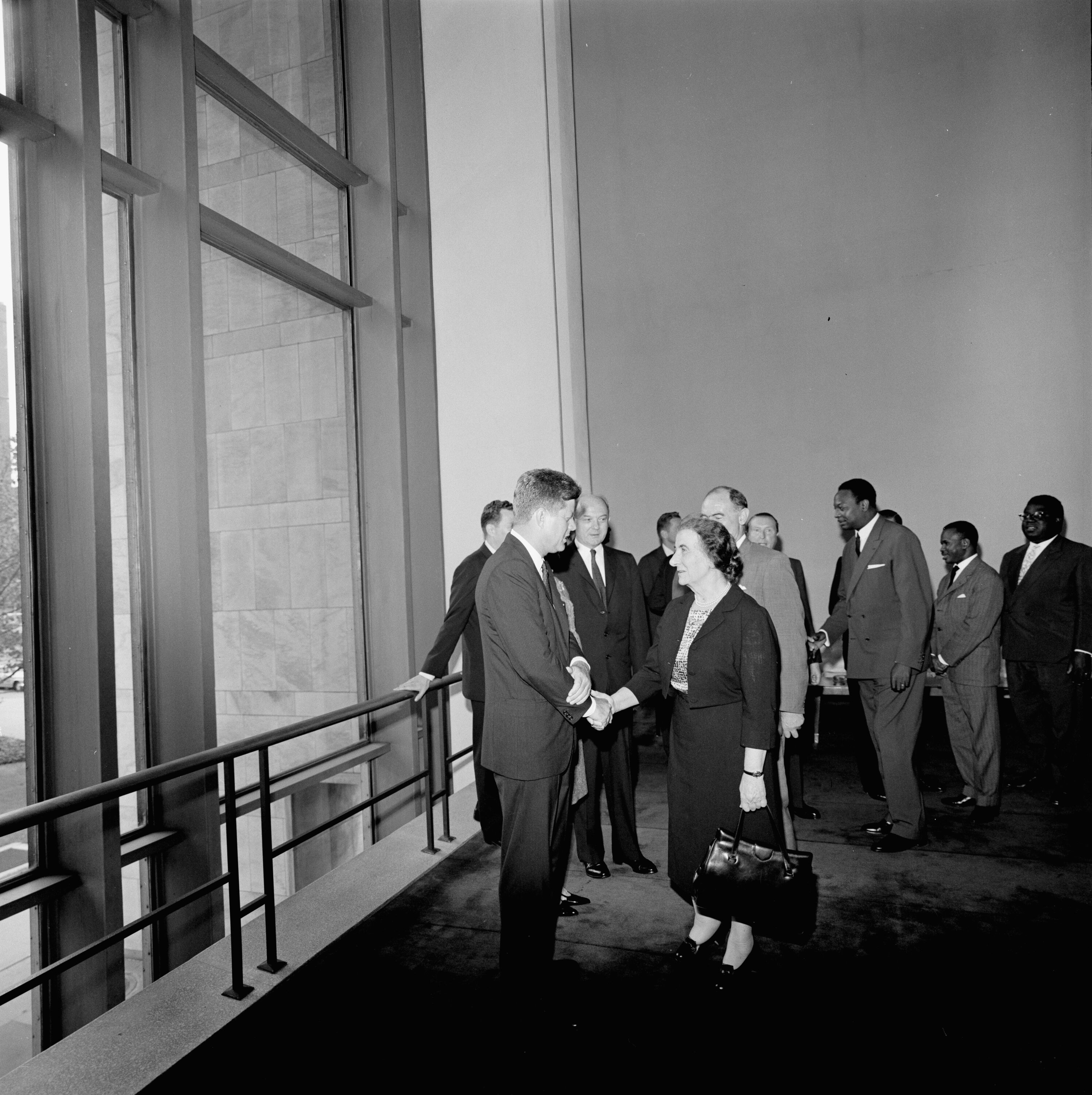
Kennedy greets Golda Meir at the General Assembly of the United Nations in 1961

Kennedy firmly believed in the U.S. commitment to Israeli security, but his Middle Eastern policy saw ambitious Pan-Arabic initiatives of Gamal Abdel Nasser. In 1960, Kennedy stated: "Israel will endure and flourish. It is the child of hope and the home of the brave. It can neither be broken by adversity nor demoralized by success. It carries the shield of democracy and it honors the sword of freedom". Beginning in spring 1961 Kennedy and Nasser began exchanging letters.

Subsequently, as president, Kennedy initiated the creation of security ties with Israel, and he is said to be the founder of the US-Israeli military alliance (which would be continued under subsequent presidents). Kennedy ended the arms embargo that both the Eisenhower and Truman administrations had enforced on Israel. Describing the protection of Israel as a moral and national commitment, he was the first to introduce the concept of a 'special relationship' (as he described it to Golda Meir) between the US and Israel.

Kennedy extended the first informal security guarantees to Israel in 1962. Beginning in 1963, Kennedy allowed the sale to Israel of advanced US weaponry (the MIM-23 Hawk), as well as to provide diplomatic support for Israeli policies which were opposed by Arab neighbours, such as its water project on the Jordan River.

In summer 1960, the U.S. embassy in Tel Aviv learned that Israel was assisted by France in the construction of what U.S. intelligence called "a significant atomic installation" in Dimona. Even though David Ben-Gurion had publicly assured the United States that Israel did not plan to develop nuclear weapons, Kennedy tried unsuccessfully to persuade Israel to permit some qualified expert (either American or from some other friendly nation) to visit Dimona. According to Seymour Hersh, the inspections were conducted in such a way that it "guaranteed that the whole procedure would be little more than a whitewash, as the president and his senior advisors had to understand: the American inspection team would have to schedule its visits well in advance, and with the full acquiescence of Israel." Marc Trachtenberg argued: "Although well aware of what the Israelis were doing, Kennedy chose to take this as satisfactory evidence of Israeli compliance with America's non-proliferation policy." The American who led the inspection team stated that the essential goal of the inspections was to find "ways to not reach the point of taking action against Israel's nuclear weapons program."

In 1962, the United States sent the MIM-23 Hawk missiles to Israel. Nonetheless, Kennedy wished to work more closely with the modernizing forces of the Arab world. In June 1962, Nasser wrote Kennedy a letter, noting that even though Egypt and the United States had differences, they could still cooperate.

Following the outburst of the North Yemen Civil War Kennedy, fearing that it would lead to a larger conflict between Egypt and Saudi Arabia (which might involve the United States as Saudi ally), decided to recognize the revolutionary regime. Kennedy hoped that it could stabilize the situation in Yemen. The president still tried to persuade Nasser to pull his troops out.

=== Iraq ===
Relations between the United States and Iraq became strained following the overthrow of the Iraqi monarchy on July 14, 1958, which resulted in the declaration of a republican government led by Brigadier Abd al-Karim Qasim. Concerned about the influence of the Iraqi Communist Party (ICP) in Qasim's administration, President Eisenhower questioned that "it might be good policy to help [Gamal Abdel Nasser] take over in Iraq," recommending that Nasser be provided with "money and support," thus the U.S. "moved into increasingly close alignment with Egypt with regard to Qasim and Iraq." Eisenhower established a Special Committee on Iraq (SCI) in April 1959 to monitor events and propose various contingencies for preventing a communist takeover of the country, and "soon developed a detailed plan for assisting nationalist elements committed to the overthrow of Qasim." The SCI was disbanded within days of Kennedy's inauguration as president, however subsequent events would return Iraq to the attention of American officials.

On June 25, 1961, Qasim mobilized troops along the border between Iraq and Kuwait, declaring the latter nation "an indivisible part of Iraq" and causing a short-lived "Kuwait Crisis." The United Kingdom, which had just granted Kuwait independence on June 19 and whose economy was heavily dependent on Kuwaiti oil supplies, responded on July 1 by dispatching 5,000 troops to the country to deter any Iraqi invasion. At the same time, Kennedy briefly dispatched a U.S. Navy task force to Bahrain, and the U.K. (at the urging of the Kennedy administration) brought the dispute to United Nations Security Council, where the proposed resolution was vetoed by the Soviet Union. The situation was finally resolved in October, when the British troops were withdrawn and replaced by a 4,000-strong Arab League force. The Kennedy administration's initially "low-key" response to the stand-off was motivated by the desire to project an image of the U.S. as "a progressive anti-colonial power trying to work productively with Arab nationalism" as well as the preference of U.S. officials to defer to the U.K. on issues related to the Persian Gulf.

Beginning in July 1961, following months of violence between feuding Kurdish tribes, Kurdish leader Mustafa Barzani returned to northern Iraq and began retaking territory from his Kurdish rivals. The Kurdistan Democratic Party (KDP) sent Qasim a list of demands in August, which included the withdrawal of Iraqi government troops from Kurdish territory and greater political freedom. For the next month, U.S. officials in Iran and Iraq predicted that a war was imminent. Faced with the loss of northern Iraq after non-Barzani Kurds seized control of a key road leading to the Iranian border in early September, Qasim finally ordered the systematic bombing of Kurdish villages on September 14, which caused Barzani to join the rebellion on September 19. The exact nature of U.S. involvement in the Kurdish War is unclear. In August 1962, Turkey arrested two U.S. Navy petty officers on charges of smuggling arms to Iraqi Kurdish rebels. Shortly thereafter, Iraq arrested two unnamed U.S. Army attachés, charging them with acting as "intermediaries between a former assistant army attaché in Iraq, Lt. Col. Harry Hall, and Iraqi Kurds." Qasim used these arrests as evidence of U.S. and British complicity in the revolt, and accused Barzani of being an American "stooge." According to Bryan R. Gibson, the U.S. repeatedly refused Kurdish requests for assistance. On the other hand, Brandon Wolfe-Hunnicutt writes that "by the summer of 1962 the United by the summer of 1962 the United States may have begun to respond favorably" to Kurdish appeals for U.S. support, and that while "[a]vailable documentation does not prove conclusively that the United States provided covert assistance to the Kurds ... the documents that have been declassified are certainly suggestive."

In December 1961, Qasim's government passed Public Law 80, which restricted the British- and American-owned Iraq Petroleum Company (IPC)'s concessionary holding to those areas in which oil was actually being produced, effectively expropriating 99.5% of the IPC concession. U.S. officials were alarmed by the expropriation as well as the recent Soviet veto of an Egyptian-sponsored UN resolution requesting the admittance of Kuwait as a UN member state, which they believed to be connected. Senior National Security Council (NSC) adviser Robert Komer worried that if the IPC ceased production in response, Qasim might "grab Kuwait" (thus achieving a "stranglehold" on Middle Eastern oil production) or "throw himself into Russian arms." At the same time, Komer made note of widespread rumors that a nationalist coup against Qasim could be imminent, and had the potential to "get Iraq back on [a] more neutral keel." Following Komer's advice, on December 30 Kennedy's National Security Advisor McGeorge Bundy sent the President a cable from the U.S. Ambassador to Iraq, John Jernegan, which argued that the U.S. was "in grave danger [of] being drawn into [a] costly and politically disastrous situation over Kuwait." Bundy also requested Kennedy's permission to "press State" to consider measures to resolve the situation with Iraq, adding that cooperation with the British was desirable "if possible, but our own interests, oil and other, are very directly involved."

In April 1962, the State Department issued new guidelines on Iraq that were intended to increase American influence in the country. Around the same time, Kennedy instructed the Central Intelligence Agency (CIA)—under the direction of Archie Roosevelt, Jr.—to begin making preparations for a military coup against Qasim. On June 2, Iraqi Foreign Minister Hashim Jawad ordered Jernegan to leave the country, stating that Iraq was also withdrawing its ambassador from Washington in retaliation for the U.S. accepting the credentials of a new Kuwaiti ambassador on June 1, which Iraq had warned would result in a downgrading of diplomatic relations. Despite repeated Iraqi warnings, senior U.S. officials were stunned by the downgrade; Kennedy had not been informed of the likely consequences of accepting the Kuwaiti ambassador.

The State Department refused requests from the U.S. Chargé d'Affaires in Baghdad, Roy Melbourne, to publicly respond to Qasim's allegations out of fear that doing so would jeopardize the remaining U.S. presence in Iraq. On February 5, 1963 Secretary of State Dean Rusk informed the U.S. embassy in Iraq that the State Department was "considering carefully whether on balance U.S. interests would be served [at] this particular juncture by abandoning [its] policy of avoiding public reaction to Qasim's charges," with the reluctance stemming from the desire to avoid compromising the CIA's "significant intelligence collecting operations": On February 7, State Department executive secretary William Brubeck informed Bundy that Iraq had become "one of the more useful spots for acquiring technical information on Soviet military and industrial equipment and on Soviet methods of operation in nonaligned areas." The CIA had earlier penetrated a top-secret Iraqi-Soviet surface-to-air missile project, which yielded intelligence on the Soviet Union's ballistic missile program.

It has long been suspected that the Ba'ath Party collaborated with the CIA in planning and carrying out the coup that overthrew Qasim on February 8, 1963. Pertinent contemporary documents relating to the CIA's operations in Iraq have remained classified and as of 2021, "[s]cholars are only beginning to uncover the extent to which the United States was involved in organizing the coup," but are "divided in their interpretations of American foreign policy."

Ba'athist leaders maintained supportive relationships with U.S. officials before, during, and after the coup. According to Wolfe-Hunnicutt, declassified documents at the Kennedy Library suggest that the Kennedy administration viewed two prominent Ba'athist officials—Ba'ath Party Army Bureau head, Lt. Col. Salih Mahdi Ammash, whose arrest on February 4 served as the coup's catalyst, and Hazim Jawad, "responsible for [the Ba'ath Party's] clandestine printing and propaganda distribution operations"—as "assets." Ammash was described as "Western-oriented, anti-British, and anti-Communist," and known to be "friendly to the service attaches of the US Embassy in Baghdad," while future U.S. Ambassador to Iraq, Robert C. Strong, would refer to Jawad as "one of our boys." According to a March 1964 State Department memorandum, U.S. "officers assiduously cultivated" a "Baathi student organization, which triggered the revolution of February 8, 1963 by sponsoring a successful student strike at the University of Baghdad." Jamal al-Atassi—a cabinet member of the Ba'athist regime that took power in Syria that same year—would tell Malik Mufti that the Iraqi Ba'athists, in conversations with their Syrian counterparts, argued "that their cooperation with the CIA and the US to overthrow Abd al-Karim Qasim and take over power" was comparable "to how Lenin arrived in a German train to carry out his revolution, saying they had arrived in an American train." Similarly, then secretary general of the Iraqi Ba'ath Party, Ali Salih al-Sa'di, is quoted as saying that the Iraqi Ba'athists "came to power on a CIA train." Former U.S. Ambassador to Saudi Arabia, James E. Akins, who worked in the Baghdad Embassy's political section from 1961 to 1964, would state that he personally witnessed contacts between Ba'ath Party members and CIA officials, and that:

The [1963 Ba'athist] revolution was of course supported by the U.S. in money and equipment as well. I don't think the equipment was terribly important, but the money was to the Ba'ath Party leaders who took over the revolution. It wasn't talked about openly—that we were behind it—but an awful lot of people knew.

Conversely, according to Gibson, the CIA official working to instigate a military coup against Qasim, and who later became the head of the CIA's operations in Iraq and Syria, has "denied any involvement in the Ba'ath Party's actions," stating instead that the CIA's efforts against Qasim were still in the planning stages at the time: "I was still engaged in contacting people who could play a role in a coup attempt against [him]."

Qasim's non-Ba'athist former deputy Abdul Salam Arif was given the largely ceremonial title of President, while prominent Ba'athist general Ahmed Hassan al-Bakr was named Prime Minister. The most powerful leader of the new government was the secretary general of the Iraqi Ba'ath Party, Ali Salih al-Sa'di, who controlled the National Guard militia and organized a massacre of hundreds—if not thousands—of suspected communists and other dissidents in the days following the coup. (National Guard members involved in the purge received U.S.-based training through the International Cooperation Administration and Agency for International Development.) The Kennedy administration viewed the prospect of an Iraqi shift in the Cold War with cautious optimism. However, U.S. officials were worried that a renewal of conflict with the Kurds could threaten the Iraqi government's survival. While Barzani had released 1,500 Arab prisoners of war as a gesture of good faith, Iraqi Foreign Minister Talib El-Shibib told Melbourne on March 3 that the government was unwilling to consider any concessions beyond cultural autonomy and was prepared to use anti-Barzani Kurds and Arab tribes in northern Iraq to co-opt the Kurds' guerrilla methods. On May 4, Melbourne delivered a message warning Shibib of the U.S. government's "serious apprehensions at [the] trend of events" and urging Iraqi officials to make "serious counter-proposals." Nevertheless, on May 22 al-Bakr bluntly told Melbourne he "could not permit this Kurdish challenge to Iraqi sovereignty to continue [for] much longer."

The fighting resumed on June 10, when the Iraqi government—which had amassed 45,000 troops in Iraqi Kurdistan—arrested members of the Kurdish negotiating delegation and declared martial law throughout northern Iraq. Meanwhile, the Soviet Union actively worked to undermine the Ba'athist government, suspending military shipments to Iraq in May, convincing its ally Mongolia to sponsor charges of genocide against Iraq at the UN General Assembly from July to September, and sponsoring a failed communist coup attempt on July 3. The Kennedy administration responded by approving a $55 million arms deal for Iraq. The new U.S. ambassador to Iraq, Robert C. Strong, informed al-Bakr of a Barzani peace proposal delivered to the U.S. consul in Tabriz on August 25; in response, al-Bakr "expressed astonishment" over American contacts with the Kurds, asking why the message had not been delivered through the Soviets. Wolfe-Hunnicutt argues that the Kennedy administration's provision of military aid to the Ba'athist government, including napalm weapons, emboldened Iraqi hardliners and was counter-productive to the administration's stated preference for a diplomatic settlement to the First Iraqi–Kurdish War. An offer by Iraqi general Hasan Sabri al-Bayati to reciprocate this gesture by sending a Soviet T-54 tank in Iraq's possession to the U.S. embassy in Baghdad for inspection became something of a "scandal" as Bayati's offer had not been approved by al-Bakr, Shibib, or other senior Iraqi officials and was rescinded by the Ba'ath Party leadership after they became aware of it.

The Ba'athist government collapsed in November 1963 over the question of unification with Syria (where a rival branch of the Ba'ath Party had seized power in March) and the extremist and uncontrollable behavior of al-Sa'di's National Guard. President Arif, with the overwhelming support of the Iraqi military, purged Ba'athists from the government and ordered the National Guard to stand down; although al-Bakr had conspired with Arif to remove al-Sa'di, on January 5, 1964, Arif removed al-Bakr from his new position as Vice President, fearful of allowing the Ba'ath Party to retain a foothold inside his government. On November 21, 1963, the Kennedy administration determined that because Arif remained the Iraqi head of state, diplomatic relations with Iraq would continue unimpeded.

=== Laos ===
After the election, Eisenhower emphasized to Kennedy that the communist threat in Southeast Asia required priority; Eisenhower considered Laos to be "the cork in the bottle" in regards to the regional threat. As Pathet Lao received Soviet support, Kennedy ordered the United States Seventh Fleet to move into the South China Sea and drew marines with helicopters into Thailand. He also instructed the American military advisers in Laos to wear military uniforms instead of the civilian clothes as a symbol of American resolve. Nonetheless Kennedy believed that if both superpowers could convince their respective allies to move toward neutrality in Laos, that country might provide a pattern for settlement of future Third World conflicts. In March 1961, Kennedy voiced a change in policy from supporting a "free" Laos to a "neutral" Laos as a solution. Kennedy's confidence in his Joint Chiefs of Staff had been shaken following the failure of the Bay of Pigs invasion. Upon receiving cables from chairman Lyman Lemnitzer he remarked to Arthur Schlesinger that "If it hadn't been for the Bay of Pigs, I might have been impressed by this". In April, 1961 the Soviet Union endorsed Kennedy's appeal for the cease fire in Laos. Eventually an agreement was signed in July 1962, proclaiming Laos neutral.

=== Turkey ===
When Kennedy came to power, the American–Turkish relations were solidly based on the containment doctrine. In April 1961 Kennedy asked for a review of the PGM-19 Jupiter deployment in Turkey. The response, drafted in June by George McGhee, indicated that cancellation of the deployment might be seen as a sign of weakness in the aftermath of Nikita Khrushchev's hard-line position at the Vienna summit.

=== Vietnam ===
After visiting Vietnam as part of a fact-finding mission to Asia and the Middle East while serving as a U.S. Congressman in 1951, Kennedy came fascinated with the area and stressed in a subsequent radio address that he strongly favored “check[ing] the southern drive of communism.” However in 1954 as France was fighting a war against the Viet Minh he said that "I am frankly of the belief that no amount of American military assistance in Indochina can conquer an enemy which is everywhere and at the same time nowhere". In January 1961, Kennedy, who also advocated for U.S. involvement in Vietnam when he was a U.S. Senator in 1956, assigned 28.4 million dollars to the enlargement of the South Vietnamese army and 12.7 million dollars to enhance the civil guard. In May, he dispatched Lyndon Johnson to meet with South Vietnam's President Ngo Dinh Diem. Johnson assured Diem of more aid to mold a fighting force that could resist the communists. Kennedy announced a change of policy from support to partnership with Diem to defeat of communism in South Vietnam. In October of the same year Kennedy dispatched General Maxwell D. Taylor and Walt Rostow to South Vietnam to study the situation there. They recommended sending 8,000 troops, but Kennedy authorized only a much smaller increase in the American advisers. Despite this, Kennedy, who was weary about the region's successful war of independence against France, was eager to not give the impression to the Vietnamese people that the United States was acting as the region's new colonizer, even stating in his journal at one point that the United States was “more and more becoming colonists in the minds of the people.”

During his administration, Kennedy continued policies that provided political and economic support, and military advice and support, to the South Vietnamese government. Late in 1961, the Viet Cong began assuming a predominant presence, initially seizing the provincial capital of Phuoc Vinh. By the end of 1961 the American advisers in Vietnam numbered 3,205 and that number increased from 11,000 in 1962 to 16,000 by late 1963, but Kennedy was reluctant to order a full-scale deployment of troops. Before his assassination, Kennedy used military advisors and special forces in Vietnam almost exclusively. A year and three months later on March 8, 1965, his successor, President Lyndon Johnson, committed the first combat troops to Vietnam and greatly escalated U.S. involvement, with forces reaching 184,000 that year and 536,000 in 1968.

In late 1961, President Kennedy sent Roger Hilsman, then director of the State Department's Bureau of Intelligence and Research, to assess the situation in Vietnam. There, Hilsman met Sir Robert Thompson, head of the British Advisory Mission to South Vietnam and the Strategic Hamlet Program was formed. It was approved by Kennedy and South Vietnam President Ngo Dinh Diem. It was implemented in early 1962 and involved some forced relocation, village internment, and segregation of rural South Vietnamese into new communities where the peasantry would be isolated from the Viet Cong. It was hoped that these new communities would provide security for the peasants and strengthen the tie between them and the central government. By November 1963 the program waned and officially ended in 1964.

In early 1962, Kennedy formally authorized escalated involvement when he signed the National Security Action Memorandum – "Subversive Insurgency (War of Liberation)". "Operation Ranch Hand", a large-scale aerial defoliation effort, began on the roadsides of South Vietnam. By the end of 1962, 109 American military personnel had been killed compared to 14 the previous year. During 1962, Viet Cong troops increased from 15,000 to 24,000. Depending on which assessment Kennedy accepted (Department of Defense or State) there had been zero or modest progress in countering the increase in communist activity in return for an expanded U.S. involvement.

In April 1963, Kennedy assessed the situation in Vietnam: "We don't have a prayer of staying in Vietnam. Those people hate us. They are going to throw our asses out of there at any point. But I can't give up that territory to the communists and get the American people to re-elect me." Kennedy faced a crisis in Vietnam by July; despite increased U.S. support, the South Vietnamese military was only marginally effective against pro-communist Viet Cong forces.

On August 21, just as the new U.S. Ambassador Henry Cabot Lodge, Jr. arrived, Diem and his brother Ngo Dinh Nhu ordered South Vietnam forces, funded and trained by the CIA, to quell Buddhist demonstrations. The crackdowns heightened expectations of a coup d'état to remove Diem with (or perhaps by) his brother, Nhu. Lodge was instructed to try to get Diem and Nhu to step down and leave the country. Diem would not listen to Lodge.

Cable 243 (DEPTEL 243), dated August 24, followed, declaring Washington would no longer tolerate Nhu's actions, and Lodge was ordered to pressure Diem to remove Nhu. If Diem refused, the Americans would explore alternative leadership. Lodge stated that the only workable option was to get the South Vietnamese generals to overthrow Diem and Nhu, as originally planned. At the same time, the first formal anti-Vietnam war sentiment was expressed by U.S. clergy from the Ministers' Vietnam Committee.

A White House meeting in September was indicative of the very different ongoing appraisals; the president was given updated assessments after personal inspections on the ground by the Department of Defense (General Victor Krulak) and the State Department (Joseph Mendenhall). Krulak said that the military fight against the communists was progressing and being won, while Mendenhall stated that the country was civilly being lost to any U.S. influence. Kennedy reacted, saying: "Did you two gentlemen visit the same country?" The president was unaware that the two men were at such odds that they had not spoken to each other on the return flight.

In October 1963, the president appointed Defense Secretary McNamara and General Taylor to a Vietnam mission in another effort to synchronize the information and formulation of policy. The objective of the McNamara Taylor mission "emphasized the importance of getting to the bottom of the differences in reporting from U.S. representatives in Vietnam." In meetings with McNamara, Taylor, and Lodge, Diem again refused to agree to governing measures, helping to dispel McNamara's previous optimism about Diem.

Taylor and McNamara were enlightened by South Vietnam's vice president, Nguyen Ngoc Tho (choice of many to succeed Diem should a coup occur), who in detailed terms obliterated Taylor's information that the military was succeeding in the countryside. Kennedy insisted, the mission report contain a recommended schedule for troop withdrawals: 1,000 by year's end and complete withdrawal in 1965, something the NSC considered a strategic fantasy. The final report declared that the military was making progress, that the increasingly unpopular Diem-led government was not vulnerable to a coup, and that an assassination of Diem or Nhu was a possibility.

In late October, intelligence wires again reported that a coup against the Diem government was afoot. The source, Vietnamese General Duong Van Minh (also known as "Big Minh"), wanted to know the U.S. position. Kennedy instructed Lodge to offer covert assistance to the coup, excluding assassination, and to ensure deniability by the U.S. Later that month, as the coup became imminent, Kennedy ordered all cables to be routed through him. A policy of "control and cut out" was initiated to ensure presidential control of U.S. responses, while cutting him out of the paper trail.

On November 1, 1963, South Vietnamese generals, led by "Big Minh", overthrew the Diem government, arresting and then killing Diem and Nhu. Kennedy was shocked by the deaths. He found out afterwards that Minh had asked the CIA field office to secure safe-passage out of the country for Diem and Nhu, but was told that 24 hours were needed to procure a plane. Minh responded that he could not hold them that long.

News of the coup led to renewed confidence initially—both in America and in South Vietnam—that the war might be won. McGeorge Bundy drafted a National Security Action Memo to present to Kennedy upon his return from Dallas. It reiterated the resolve to fight communism in Vietnam, with increasing military and economic aid and expansion of operations into Laos and Cambodia. Before leaving for Dallas, Kennedy told Michael Forrestal that "after the first of the year ... [he wanted] an in depth study of every possible option, including how to get out of there ... to review this whole thing from the bottom to the top." When asked what he thought the president meant, Forrestal said, "it was devil's advocate stuff."

Historians disagree on whether Vietnam would have escalated if Kennedy not been assassinated and had won re-election in 1964. The film "The Fog of War" contains a tape recording of Lyndon Johnson stating that Kennedy was planning to withdraw, a position with which Johnson disagreed. Kennedy had signed National Security Action Memorandum (NSAM) 263, dated October 11, which ordered the withdrawal of 1,000 military personnel by the end of the year, and the bulk of them out by 1965. Such an action would have been a policy reversal, but Kennedy was publicly moving in a less hawkish direction since his speech about world peace at American University on June 10, 1963. Kennedy's interview with journalist Walter Cronkite on September 2, 1963, did not give a clear indication. He stated, that "...in the final analysis, it is their war. They are the ones who have to win or lose it. We can help them, we can give them equipment,...send our men out there as advisers, but they have to win it." He then added, "...I don't agree with those who say we should withdraw." According to historian Dallek, Kennedy used this TV interview and a second one on NBC to pressure Diem on government reforms and second, to suggest future US options.

At the time of Kennedy's death, no final policy decision had been made as to Vietnam. In 2008, Theodore Sorensen speculated: "I would like to believe that Kennedy would have found a way to withdraw all American instructors and advisors [from Vietnam]. But... I do not believe he knew in his last weeks what he was going to do." Sorensen added that, in his opinion, Vietnam "was the only foreign policy problem handed off by JFK to his successor in no better, and possibly worse, shape than it was when he inherited it." U.S. involvement in the region escalated until his successor Lyndon Johnson directly deployed regular U.S. military forces for fighting the Vietnam War. After Kennedy's assassination, President Johnson signed NSAM 273 on November 26, 1963 which reaffirmed the policy of assistance to the South Vietnamese.

== Global South ==
=== Latin America ===
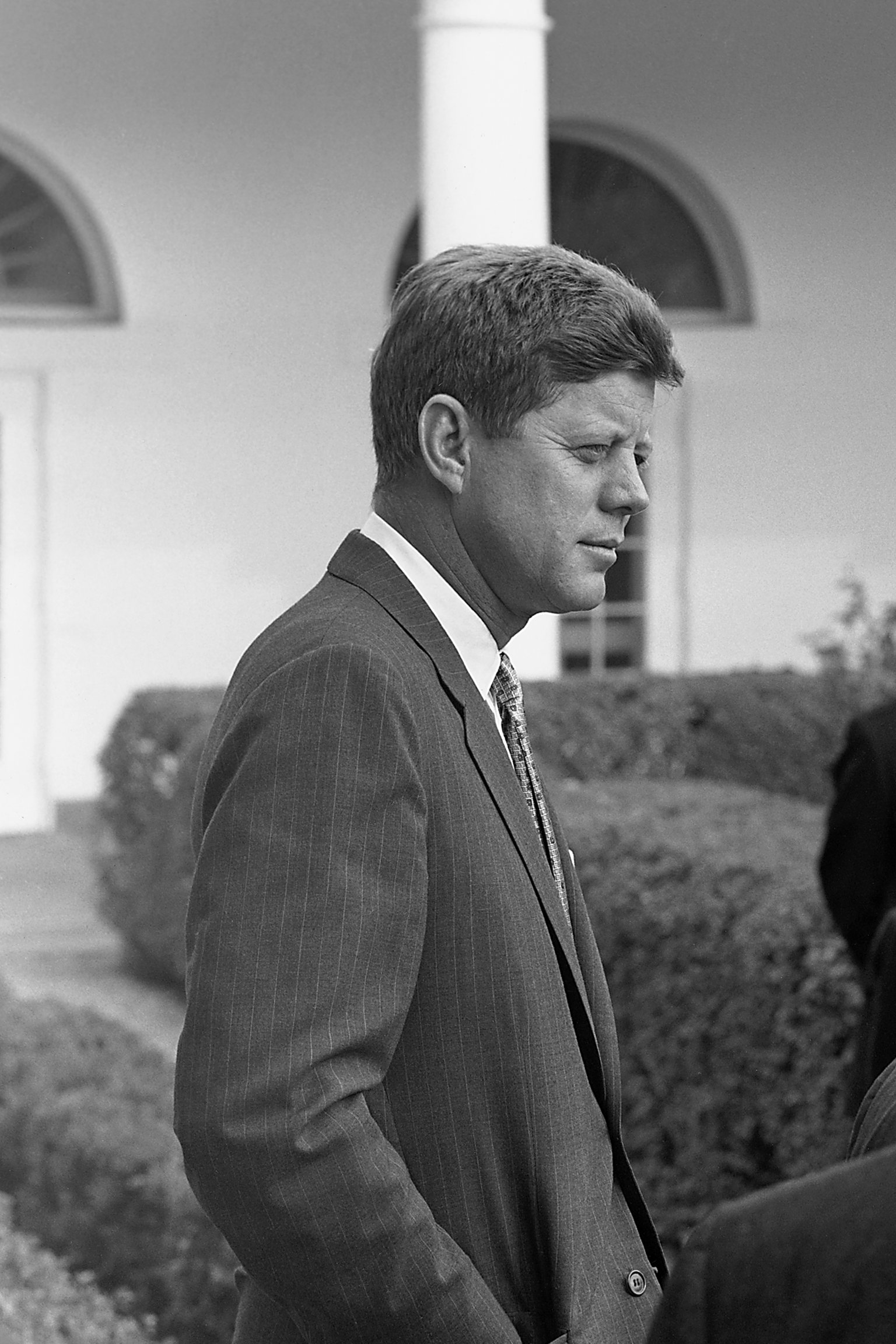
Kennedy greets Latin American archivists in the White House Rose Garden

Official motion picture on Kennedy's tour of Latin America in December 1961.

The main new Kennedy initiative was the Alliance for Progress. Its goals included long-term permanent improvement in living conditions. The methods included advancing industrialization, increasing their exports and diversifying the products exported, reducing trade barriers between Latin American countries, and improving their communications systems. The primary tactics were loans from the US government and cash grants. At a theoretical level, Kennedy's planners hoped to reverse the under-development of the region and its dependency on North America. There was a fear that if the United States neglected the region, Castro's Cuba would introduce anti-American political and economic changes.

The Kennedy administration came to power in wake of the radicalization of Fidel Castro's Cuba, and saw the region as a Cold War battleground. Kennedy believed communism could be thwarted by economic modernization through the Alliance for Progress. Although it achieved far less than Kennedy had hoped, its ideals, together with Kennedy's personal qualities, gave him an unusual and lasting degree of popularity in Latin America. The administration presided over a number of covert interventions, and according to historian Stephen G. Rabe, "demonstrably bolstered regimes and groups that were undemocratic, conservative, and frequently repressive."

In December 1961, Kennedy toured Puerto Rico, Venezuela and Colombia. Kennedy's sanguine welcome stood in sharp contrast to then-Vice President Richard Nixon's Latin America tour of May 1958. On Kennedy's departure from Caracas, President Rómulo Betancourt said that "we receive as friends those who are our friends."

His 1962 trip to Mexico evoked an enthusiastic response to his Alliance for Progress vision. In that year Mexican President Adolfo López Mateos told Kennedy that for the sake of improvement of the Mexican–American relations the Chamizal dispute should be solved. The U.S. and Mexican joint efforts in that field ultimately produced the Chamizal Convention.

Following the 1962 Peruvian coup d'état Kennedy applied sanctions and refused to recognise the junta. However once it became clear that the junta was remaining in control and this policy was out of step with the rest of Latin America Kennedy acquiesced and normalised relations. After the 1963 Dominican coup d'état forced out the democratically elected leader Juan Bosch, Kennedy suspended aid and cut off diplomatic relations with the country.

=== New Nations ===
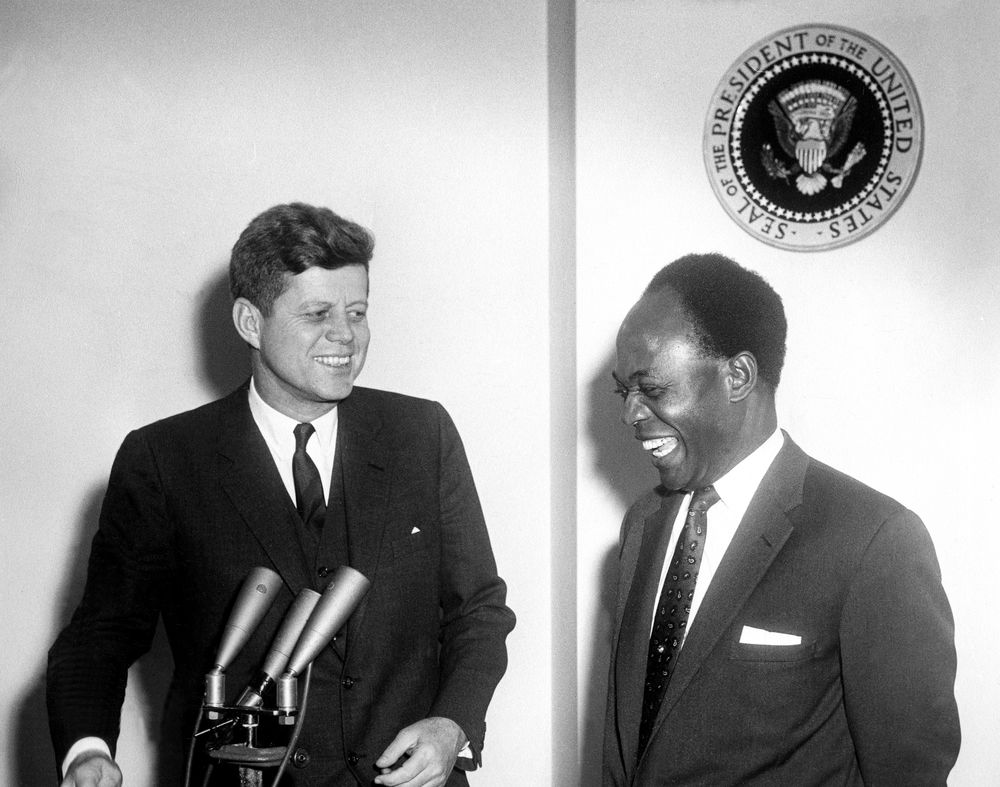
Kennedy with Kwame Nkrumah, the first president of an independent Ghana, March 1961.

Between 1960 and 1963, twenty-four countries gained independence as the process of decolonization continued. They all joined the "Third World." Many sought to avoid close alignment with either the United States or the Soviet Union. In 1961, the leaders of India, Yugoslavia, Indonesia, Egypt, and Ghana created the Non-Aligned Movement. Instead of encouraging this development Kennedy wanted them to look to the U.S. as a role model. He wooed their leaders, expanding economic aid and appointing knowledgeable ambassadors. He placed a special emphasis on Africa, and he forged close relationships with several African leaders. Kennedy considered the Congo Crisis to be one of the most important foreign policy issues facing his presidency, and he supported a UN operation that prevented the secession of the State of Katanga.

Kennedy sought closer relations with Indian Prime Minister Jawaharlal Nehru through increased economic and a tilt away from Pakistan, but made little progress in bringing India closer to the United States. Kennedy also hoped to minimize Soviet influence in Egypt through good relations with President Gamal Abdel Nasser, but Nasser's hostility towards Saudi Arabia and Jordan closed off the possibility of closer relations.

His administration established the Food for Peace program and the Peace Corps to provide aid to developing countries in various ways. Together with the Alliance for Progress in Latin America they promoted modernization and development in poor nations. Food for Peace program became a central element in American foreign policy. It eventually helped many countries to develop their economies and become commercial import customers. The Peace Corps grew to 5,000 members by March 1963 and 10,000 the following year.

=== Africa ===
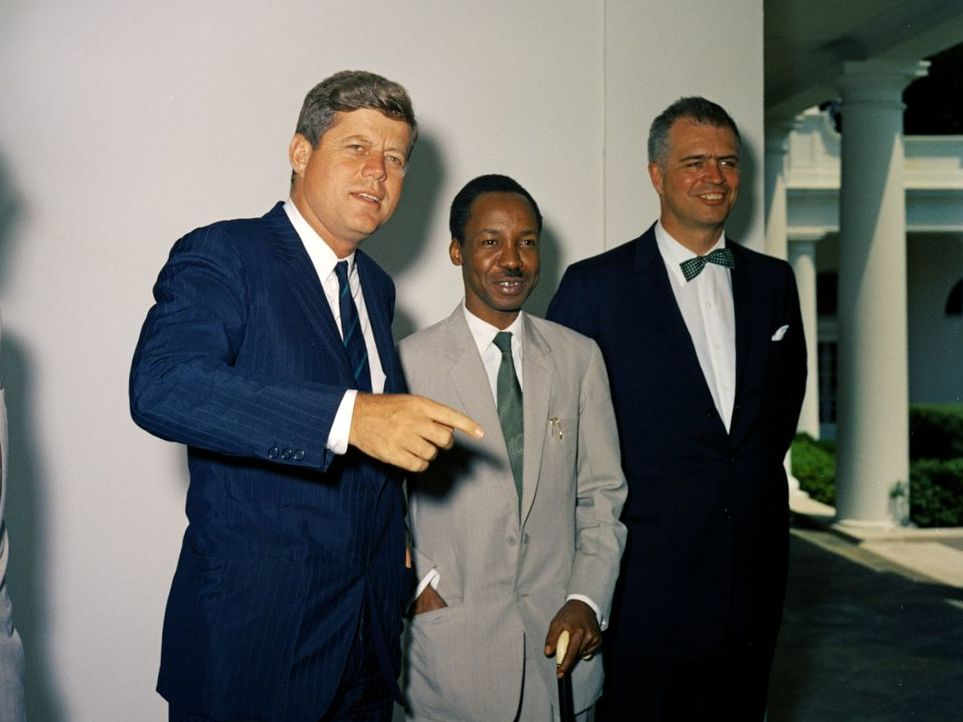
G. Mennen Williams (right), President of Tanganyika Julius Nyerere (center), and Kennedy in 1963

Kennedy had a special interest in Africa even before his presidency. In 1957 he had voiced support for the independence of Algeria and spoke about the "many cases of the clash between independence and imperialism in the Western World that demand our attention". In 1959 he chaired the new subcommittee on Africa of the Senate Foreign Relations Committee. During the election campaign, Kennedy managed to mention Africa nearly 500 times, often attacking the Eisenhower administration for losing ground on that continent: "We have neglected and ignored the needs and aspirations of the African people. The word is out – and spreading like wildfire in nearly 1000 languages and dialects – that it is no longer necessary to remain poor or forever in bondage." He named G. Mennen Williams as his Assistant Secretary of State for African affairs, directing him to tell African leaders that we wanted friendship with them and we wanted to recognize their independence. This message was also expressed in his inauguration speech where he declared: "To those new states whom we welcome to the ranks of the free, we pledge our word that one form of colonial control shall not have passed away merely to be replaced by a far more iron tyranny".

Kennedy named young appointees to several embassies, such as William Attwood to Guinea and William P. Mahoney to Ghana. Other appointees included scholar John Badeau (to Egypt), liberal Democrats with government experience Philip Kaiser, John Ferguson and James Loeb (to Senegal, Mauritania, Morocco and Guinea). Ambassador to South Africa, Joseph C. Satterthwaite, later recalled that Kennedy had instructed him "You can tell the prime minister of South Africa that I'm not sending you out there to point your finger at them, (the South Africans) but that they must realize the problems we have with their racial policy". However in August 1963 he announced that the US would implement an arms embargo against South Africa by the end of the year.

The Kennedy administration believed that the British African colonies would soon achieve independence. According to Nigerian diplomat Samuel Ibe, "with Kennedy there were sparks"; the Prime Minister of Sudan Ibrahim Abboud, cherishing a hunting rifle Kennedy gave him, expressed the wish to go out on safari with Kennedy.

In November 1961 Senegalese President Léopold Sédar Senghor visited the White House, where a dinner was held. By the spring of 1962 the new style aid made its way to Guinea. On his return from Washington to Conakry, Guinean leader Ahmed Sékou Touré reported to his people that he and Guinean delegation found in Kennedy "a man quite open to African problems and determined to promote the American contribution to their happy solution". Touré also expressed his satisfaction about the "firmness with which the United States struggles against racial discrimination".

=== Congo Crisis ===
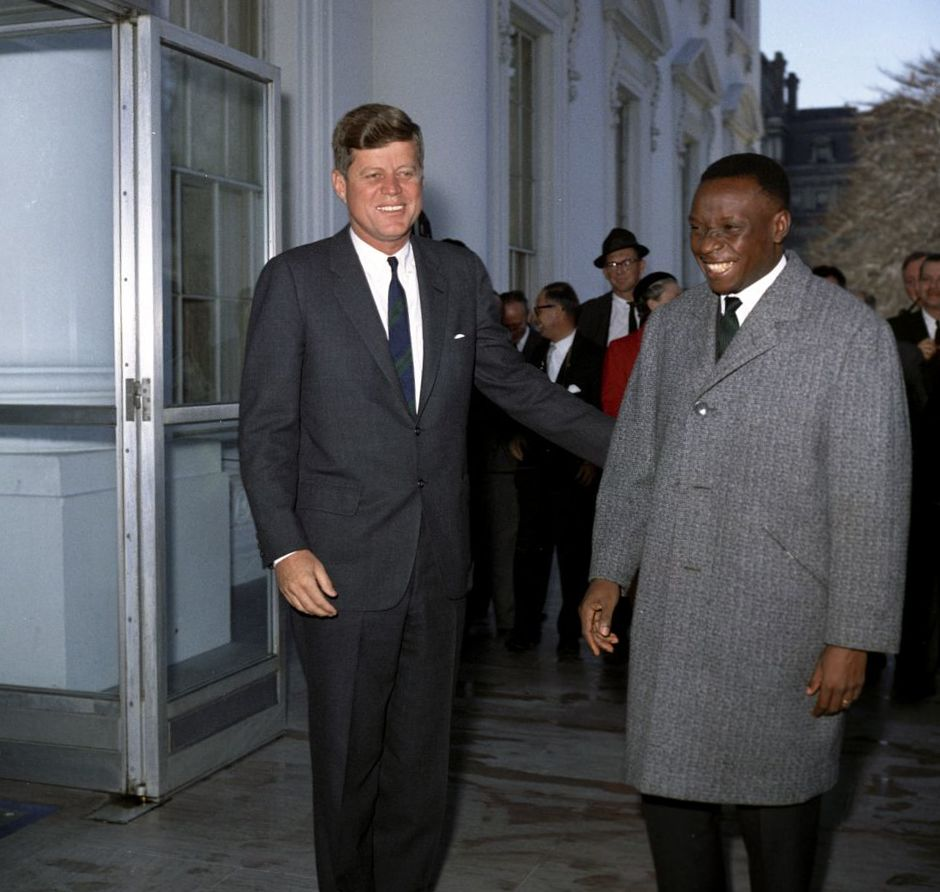
President Kennedy with Congolese Prime Minister Cyrille Adoula in 1962

The Congo Crisis was the most pressing. According to White House aide Roger Hilsman, "history could have hardly devised a more baffling and frustrating test" for the administration than the situation in the Congo. The Republic of the Congo was given its independence from Belgian colonial rule on June 30, 1960, but quickly fell into chaos five days later when the army mutinied. On July 11, the breakaway State of Katanga under Moïse Tshombe declared independence from the Congo, followed the next month by South Kasai. Both had the support of the Belgian government. On July 13 the United Nations Security Council authorized the formation of the United Nations Operation in the Congo (known as ONUC) to help restore order in the country. The Eisenhower administration hoped to reach a diplomatic solution before the Soviet Union intervened. Attempts to exert influence on Congolese Prime Minister Patrice Lumumba failed, who alternatively brought in Soviet assistance to aid in suppressing the secessionist states. Plans were drawn up by the United States government to depose Lumumba, including an assassination plot. However, on September 5 the prime minister was dismissed by Congolese President Joseph Kasa-Vubu. Lumumba contested the action, and on September 14 Colonel Joseph Mobutu launched a coup which definitively removed him from power and ordered the Soviets to leave the country. On 27 November Lumumba fled the capital to form his own government in east with his deputy, Antoine Gizenga. With technical support from the United States and Belgium, Mobutu's troops managed to arrest him before he could succeed in reaching Stanleyville. On 17 January 1961 discipline at the army base where Lumumba was detained faltered and he was flown to Élisabethville, Katanga. Once there, he was brutally tortured at the hands of Tshombe and subsequently executed via firing squad.

Kennedy and his incoming advisers were apparently unaware of the CIA's involvement in Lumumba's death. In fact, Kennedy wasn't even aware Lumumba had been killed until 13 February. He had been of the opinion that Lumumba, though not to resume power, was to be released from prison. Kennedy was informed of Lumumba's murder by United Nations ambassador Adlai Stevenson and according to Jacques Lowe who was with him at the time "his hand went to his head in utter despair, 'Oh, no,' I heard him groan".

Deputy Assistant Secretary of State J. Wayne Fredericks of the Bureau of African Affairs, the Kennedy administration's leading specialist on Africa, played a major role in constructing American policy for the suppression of Katanga.

On October 2, 1962 Kennedy signed United Nations bond issue bill to ensure American assistance in financing United Nations peacekeeping operations in the Congo and elsewhere. Around this time, the Kennedy Administration was making private attempts to convince Tshombe to reunite the breakaway Katanga that he led with the Congo, in advance of UN intervention.

=== Peace Corps ===
Establishment of the Peace Corps
John F. Kennedy's announcement of the establishment of the Peace Corps

An agency to enable Americans to volunteer in developing countries appealed to Kennedy because it fit in with his campaign themes of self-sacrifice and volunteerism, while also providing a way to redefine American relations with the Third World. Upon taking office, Kennedy issued an executive order establishing the Peace Corps, and he named his brother-in-law, Sargent Shriver, as the agency's first director. Shriver, not Kennedy, energetically lobbied Congress for approval. Kennedy proudly took the credit, and ensured that it remained free of CIA influence. He largely left its administration to Shriver. To avoid the appearance of favoritism to the Catholic Church, the Corps did not place its volunteers with any religious agencies. In the first twenty-five years, more than 100,000 Americans served in 44 countries as part of the program. Most volunteers taught English in local schools, but many became involved in activities like construction and food delivery. Shriver practiced affirmative action, and women comprised about 40 percent of the first 7000 volunteers. However given the paucity of black college graduates, racial minorities never reached five percent. The Corps developed its own training program, based on nine weeks at an American university, with a focus on conversational language, world affairs, and desired job skills. That was followed by three weeks at a Peace Corps camp in Puerto Rico, and week or two of orientation the home and the host country.

=== Modernization ===
Kennedy relied on economists W.W. Rostow on his staff and outsider John Kenneth Galbraith for ideas on how to promote rapid economic development in the "Third World". They promoted modernization models in order to reorient American aid to Asia, Africa and Latin America. In the Rostow version in his The Stages of Economic Growth (1960) progress must pass through five stages, and for underdeveloped world the critical stages were the second one, the transition, the third stage, the takeoff into self-sustaining growth. Rostow argued that American intervention could propel a country from the second to the third stage he expected that once it reached maturity, it would have a large energized middle class that would establish democracy and civil liberties and institutionalize human rights. The result was a comprehensive theory that could be used to challenge Marxist ideologies, and thereby repel communist advances. The model provided the foundation for the Alliance for Progress in Latin America, the Peace Corps, Food for Peace, and the Agency for International Development (AID), and numerous programs in South Vietnam, especially building strategic hamlets against the communist threat. Kennedy proclaimed the 1960s the "Development Decade" and substantially increased the budget for foreign assistance. Modernization theory supplied the design, rationale, and justification for these programs. The goals proved much too ambitious, and the economists in a few years abandoned the European-based modernization model as inappropriate to the cultures they were trying to impact.

Kennedy and his top advisers were working from implicit ideological assumptions regarding modernization. They firmly believed modernity was not only good for the target populations, but was essential to avoid communism on the one hand or extreme control of traditional rural society by the very rich landowners on the other. They believed America had a duty, as the most modern country in the world, to promulgate this ideal to the poor nations of the Third World. They wanted programs that were altruistic, and benevolent—and also tough, energetic, and determined. It was benevolence with a foreign policy purpose. Michael Latham has identified how this ideology worked out in three major programs the Alliance for Progress, the Peace Corps, and the strategic hamlet program in South Vietnam. However, Latham argues that the ideology was a non-coercive version of the modernization goals of the imperialistic of Britain, France and other European countries in the 19th century .

== Trade policy ==
Europe had started to integrate economically and American policy was to encourage this, and to become more engaged with Europe. The creation of the European Economic Community (EEC) in 1957 lowered tariffs inside Europe. It posed a challenge to Washington, warned Under Secretary of State George Ball, himself a committed Europeanist who had represented foreign steel producers as a trade lawyer. The fear was that the U.S. with its higher standard of living, higher labor costs, and its insular political tradition would see American products losing markets in Europe. Furthermore, there was a nagging fear that the Soviet economic growth was catching up with the United States. The solution was reducing the tariffs between the U.S. and Europe. However powerful business groups, especially chemicals, steel, machine tools, and electronics. They had succeeded in 1958 in blocking Eisenhower's request for authority to negotiate reduced tariffs. Nevertheless, Kennedy pressed for the passage of the Trade Expansion Act of 1962, which gave the president authority to decrease duties up to 50% from their 1962 levels or increase them up to 50% from their 1934 levels. After the act was passed, the administration pressed for a new round of multilateral trade talks to utilize its new authority, which would become known as the Kennedy Round as a memorial after Kennedy's death.

== Legacy ==
In terms of evaluating Kennedy's foreign policy, historians and biographers have been deeply split between highly favorable and quite negative. One group praised Kennedy as a consummate pragmatist, skilled crisis manager, and, indeed, a great world leader. The full disaster in Vietnam had not yet played out when they wrote. They included Arthur Schlesinger Jr., Theodore Sorensen, and Roger Hilsman. The opposition, angered and animated by the Vietnam War, launched their attack in the 1970s, focusing mostly on his responsibility for escalating the Vietnam War, his imperialism regarding Latin America and Africa, and his repeated promises to be the aggressive cold warrior who would challenge the Soviets more vigorously than Eisenhower did. They included David Halberstam, Louise Fitzsimons, Richard J. Walton, and Henry Fairlie.

Vietnam and the Cold War are the two major issues that faced the Kennedy presidency. Historians disagree. However, there is general scholarly agreement that his presidency was successful on a number of lesser issues. Thomas Paterson finds that the Kennedy administration helped quiet the crisis over Laos; was suitably cautious about the Congo; liberalized trade; took the lead in humanitarianism especially with the Peace Corps; helped solve a nasty dispute between Indonesia and the Netherlands; achieved the Limited Test Ban Treaty; created a new Arms Control and Disarmament Agency; defended Berlin; and strengthened European defenses. His willingness to negotiate with Khrushchev smoothed the Berlin crisis, and Kennedy's personal diplomacy earned him the respect of Third World leaders.

On the two major issues, no consensus has been reached. Michael L. Krenn argues in 2017:

Fifty-some years after his assassination, John F. Kennedy remains an enigma. Was he the brash and impulsive president who brought the world to the brink of World War III with the Cuban Missile Crisis? Or was he the brave challenger of the American military-industrial complex who would have prevented the Vietnam War? Various studies portray him as a Cold War liberal, or a liberal Cold Warrior, or come up with pithy phrases to summarize the man and his foreign policy.

== See also ==
- List of international presidential trips made by John F. Kennedy
- Pentagon Papers

== Bibliography ==
- Ashton, N. (2002). Kennedy, Macmillan and the Cold War: The Irony of Interdependence (illustrated ed.). Springer. ISBN 9780230800014.
- Bernstein, Irving (1991). Promises Kept: John F. Kennedy's New Frontier.
- Blight, James G.; Lang, Janet M. (2005). The Fog of War: Eleven Lessons from the Life of Robert S. McNamara. Lanham, Md.: Rowman & Littlefield. ISBN 978-0-7425-4221-1.
- Brinkley, Alan (2012). John F. Kennedy. Times Books. ISBN 978-0-8050-8349-1.
- Citino, Nathan J. (2017). "The People's Court". Envisioning the Arab Future: Modernization in US-Arab Relations, 1945–1967. Cambridge University Press. ISBN 9781108107556.
- Dallek, Robert (2003). An Unfinished Life: John F. Kennedy, 1917–1963. Boston, MA: Little, Brown and Co. ISBN 978-0-316-17238-7.
- Douglass, James W. (2010). JFK and the Unspeakable: Why He Died and Why It Matters (reprint ed.). Simon and Schuster. ISBN 9781439193884.
- Dunnigan, James; Nofi, Albert (1999). Dirty Little Secrets of the Vietnam War. St. Martin's. ISBN 978-0-312-19857-2.
- Gibbs, David N. (1 November 1991). The Political Economy of Third World Intervention: Mines, Money, and U.S. Policy in the Congo Crisis. American Politics and Political Economy. University of Chicago Press. ISBN 9780226290713.
- Gibson, Bryan R. (2015). Sold Out? US Foreign Policy, Iraq, the Kurds, and the Cold War. Palgrave Macmillan. ISBN 978-1-137-48711-7.
- Giglio, James N. (2006). The Presidency of John F. Kennedy. University Press of Kansas. ISBN 978-0-7006-1436-3.
- Gondola, Ch. Didier (2002). The History of Congo. Greenwood histories of the modern nations (illustrated, annotated ed.). Greenwood Publishing Group. ISBN 9780313316968. ISSN 1096-2905.
- Herring, George C. (2008). From Colony to Superpower; U.S. Foreign Relations Since 1776. Oxford University Press. ISBN 978-0-19-507822-0.
- Karnow, Stanley (1991). Vietnam, A History. Penguin. ISBN 978-0-670-74604-0.
- Matthews, Chris (2011a). Jack Kennedy: Elusive Hero. Simon & Schuster. ISBN 978-1-4516-3508-9.

Matthews, Weldon C. (9 November 2011b). "The Kennedy Administration, Counterinsurgency, and Iraq's First Ba'thist Regime". International Journal of Middle East Studies. 43 (4): 635–653. doi:10.1017/S0020743811000882. ISSN 1471-6380.

- Nzongola-Ntalaja, Georges (2002). The Congo: From Leopold to Kabila: A People's History (illustrated, reprint ed.). Zed Books. ISBN 9781842770535.
- Parmet, Herbert S. (1983). JFK: The Presidency of John F. Kennedy. New York: Dial Press. ISBN 978-0-140-07054-5.
- Paterson, Thomas G., ed. (1989). Kennedy's Quest for Victory: American Foreign Policy, 1961-1963. Oxford University Press. ISBN 9780195045840.
- Patterson, James (1996). Grand Expectations: The United States 19451974. Oxford University Press. ISBN 978-0195117974.
- Rabe, Stephen G. (1999). The Most Dangerous Area in the World: John F. Kennedy Confronts Communist Revolution in Latin America. Chapel Hill: University of North Carolina press. ISBN 978-0807847640.
- Reeves, Richard (1993). President Kennedy: Profile of Power. New York: Simon & Schuster. ISBN 978-0-671-64879-4.
- Schlesinger, Arthur M. Jr (2002) [1965]. A Thousand Days: John F. Kennedy in the White House. Mariner Books. ISBN 978-0-618-21927-8.
- Sorensen, Theodore (1966) [1965]. Kennedy (paperback). New York: Bantam. OCLC 2746832.
- Tucker, Spencer (2011) [1998]. The Encyclopedia of the Vietnam War: A Political, Social, and Military History. ABC-CLIO. ISBN 978-1851099603.

=== Further reading ===
- Andrew, Christopher. For the President’s Eyes Only: Secret Intelligence and the American Presidency from Washington to Bush (1995), pp 257–306.
- Angelo, Anne-Marie, and Tom Adam Davies. "'American business can assist [African] hands:' the Kennedy administration, US corporations, and the cold war struggle for Africa." The Sixties 8.2 (2015): 156–178.
- Autiello, Nicholas Anthony. “Taming the Wild Dragon: John F. Kennedy and the Republic of China, 1961–63.” Cold War History DOI: https://doi.org/10.1080/14682745.2018.1550077. online review
- Beschloss, Michael R. The Crisis Years: Kennedy and Khrushchev, 1960-1963 (1991).
- Boyko, John. Cold Fire: Kennedy's Northern Front (Alfred A. Knopf Canada, 2016), on Canada
- Brinkley, Douglas, and Richard T. Griffiths, eds. John F. Kennedy and Europe (1999) essays by experts.
- Busch, Peter. All the Way With JFK? Britain, the US, and the Vietnam War (2003).
- Colman, Jonathan. "The ‘Bowl of Jelly’: The US Department of State during the Kennedy and Johnson Years, 1961–1968." Hague Journal of Diplomacy 10.2 (2015): 172-196.
- Cull, Nicholas J. "‘The man who invented truth’: The tenure of Edward R. Murrow as director of the United States Information Agency during the Kennedy years." Cold War History 4.1 (2003): 23-48.
- David, Andrew, and Michael Holm. "The Kennedy Administration and the Battle over Foreign Aid: The Untold Story of the Clay Committee." Diplomacy & Statecraft 27.1 (2016): 65–92.
- Dean, Robert D. "Masculinity as Ideology: John F. Kennedy and the Domestic Politics of Foreign Policy." Diplomatic History 22.1 (1998): 29–62.
- Dunne, Michael. "Kennedy's Alliance for Progress: countering revolution in Latin America Part II: the historiographical record." International Affairs 92.2 (2016): 435–452.
- Falk, Stanley L. "The National Security Council under Truman, Eisenhower, and Kennedy." Political Science Quarterly 79.3 (1964): 403–434. online
- Fatalski, Marcin. "The United States and the Fall of the Trujillo Regime." Ad Americam. Journal of American Studies 14 (2013): 7-18.
- Field, Thomas C. From Development to Dictatorship: Bolivia and the Alliance for Progress in the Kennedy Era (2014).
- Freedman, Lawrence. Kennedy's Wars: Berlin, Cuba, Laos and Vietnam (2000).
- Fursenko, Aleksandr and Timothy Naftali. One Hell of a Gamble: Khrushchev, Castro and Kennedy, 1958–1964 (1997).
- Gavin, Francis J. Gold, Dollars, and Power: The Politics of International Monetary Relations, 1958-1971 (2007).
- Gioe, David, Len Scott, and Christopher Andrew, eds. An International History of the Cuban Missile Crisis (2014), essays by scholars.
- Giglio, James N. The Presidency of John F. Kennedy (2006).
- Gleijeses, Piero. "Ships in the Night: The CIA, the White House and the Bay of Pigs" Journal of Latin American Studies (1995) 27#1 1–42.
- Grubbs, Larry. Secular Missionaries: Americans and African Development in the 1960s (2010).
- Hurley, Christopher John. The Imperial Imperative: John F Kennedy and US Foreign Relations. (Master of Research (MRes) thesis, University of Kent, 2018) online
- Hybel, A. US Foreign Policy Decision-making from Truman to Kennedy: Responses to International Challenges (Springer, 2016).
- Jones, Howard. The Bay of Pigs (2008).
- Kang, Jean S. “Maintaining the Status Quo: U.S. Response to Chinese Nationalist Mainland Recovery Efforts, 1961–1963,” Journal of American-East Asian Relations 15:1-2 (2008): 173–194.
- Kaufman, Burton I. "John F. Kennedy as world leader: A perspective on the literature." Diplomatic History 17.3 (1993): 447–470.
- Kempe, Frederick. Berlin 1961: Kennedy, Khrushchev, and the most dangerous place on earth (2011).
- Kochavi, Noam. A Conflict Perpetuated: China Policy During the Kennedy Years (2002).
- Kunz, Diane B. ed. The Diplomacy of the Crucial Decade: American American foreign relations during the 1960s (1994).
- Logevall, Fredrik. Choosing War: The Lost Chance for Peace and the Escalation of War in Vietnam (1999).
- McKercher, Asa. Camelot and Canada: Canadian-American Relations in the Kennedy Era (Oxford UP, 2016).
- Muehlenbeck, Philip Emil. Betting on the Africans: John F. Kennedy's courting of African nationalist leaders (Oxford University Press, 2012).
- Nelson, Anna Kasten. "President Kennedy's national security policy: A reconsideration." Reviews in American History 19.1 (1991): 1-14. Online
- Newman, John M. JFK and Vietnam: Deception, Intrigue, and the Struggle for Power (1992).
- Newmann, William W. "Searching for the Right Balance? Managing Foreign Policy Decisions under Eisenhower and Kennedy." Congress & the Presidency 42#2 (2015).
- O'Brien, Michael. John F. Kennedy: A Biography (2005).
- Pellegrin, Charles J. “‘There Are Bigger Issues at Stake’: The Administration of John F. Kennedy and United States-Republic of China Relations, 1961–63,” in John Delane Williams, Robert G. Waite, and Gregory S. Gordon, eds., John F. Kennedy, History, Memory, and Legacy: An Interdisciplinary Inquiry (University of North Dakota, 2010), 100-115.
- Pelz, Stephen E. "'When Do I Have Time to Think?' John F. Kennedy, Roger Hilsman, and the Laotian Crisis of 1962." Diplomatic History 3.2 (1979): 215-230.
- Powaski, Ronald E. "John F. Kennedy, the Hawks, the Doves, and the Cuban Missile Crisis, 1962." in American Presidential Statecraft (2017) pp. 11–65.
- Preston, Andrew. "The Little State Department: McGeorge Bundy and the National Security Council Staff, 1961‐65." Presidential Studies Quarterly 31.4 (2001): 635–659. Online
- Rabe, Stephen G. John F. Kennedy: World Leader (Potomac Books, 2010).
- Rakove, Robert B. Kennedy, Johnson and the Nonaligned World (2013) .
- Rizas, Sotiris. "Formulating a policy towards Eastern Europe on the eve of Détente: The USA, the Allies and Bridge Building, 1961–1964." Journal of Transatlantic Studies 12.1 (2014): 18–40.
- Schaffer, Howard B. Chester Bowles: New Dealer in the Cold War (1993).
- Schoenbaum, Thomas J. Waging Peace and War: Dean Rusk in the Truman, Kennedy and Johnson Years (1988).
- Selverstone, Marc J. "Eternal Flaming: The Historiography of Kennedy Foreign Policy," Passport: The Newsletter of the SHAFR (April 2015), Vol. 46 Issue 1, pp 22–29.
- Selverstone, Marc J., ed. A Companion to John F. Kennedy (2014) emphasis on historiography.
- Sergunin, Alexander. "John F. Kennedy’s Decision-Making on the Berlin Crisis of 1961." Review of History and Political Science 2.1 (2014): 1-27. online
- Shields, David. Kennedy and Macmillan: Cold War Politics (2006). excerpt
- Shapley, Deborah. Promise and Power: The Life and Times of Robert McNamara (1993).
- Simpson, Bradley R. Economists with Guns: Authoritarian Development and U.S.-Indonesian Relations, 1960-1968 (2008).
- Stebbins, Richard P. The United States in World Affairs, 1961 (Harper and Council on Foreign Relations. 1964), 430pp; annual for 1961-1963. Detailed coverage and analysis; online review
- Taubman, William. Khrushchev: The Man and His Era (2012), Pulitzer Prize
- Walton, Richard J. Cold War and Counterrevolution: The foreign policy of John F. Kennedy(1972).
- Wenger, Andreas, and Marcel Gerber. "John F. Kennedy and the limited test ban treaty: A case study of presidential leadership." Presidential Studies Quarterly 29.2 (1999): 460–487.
- Zubok, Vladislav. Inside the Kremlin's Cold War: From Stalin to Khrushchev (1995). except

=== Primary sources and memoirs ===
- Hilsman, Roger. To Move a Nation: The Politics of Foreign Policy in the Administration of John F. Kennedy (1967)
- The Pentagon Papers: The Defense Department History of United States Decisionmaking on Vietnam. Boston: Beacon Press. 5 vols. "Senator Gravel Edition"; includes documents not included in government version. ISBN 0-8070-0526-6 & ISBN 0-8070-0522-3.
- Schlesinger, Arthur M. Jr. A Thousand Days: John F. Kennedy in the White House (1965)
- Sorensen, Theodore C. Kennedy (1965).
- Stebbins, Richard P. ed. Documents on America Foreign Relations 1961 (Harper and Council on Foreign Relations. 1964); 550 pp; annual for 1961-1963. All major public documents; online review

=== Historiography and memory ===
- Beck, Kent M. "The Kennedy Image: Politics, Camelot, and Vietnam." Wisconsin Magazine of History (1974) 58#1: 45–55. online
- Brown, Thomas. JFK: History of an Image (1988).
- Chai, Jae Hyung. "Presidential Control of the Foreign Policy Bureaucracy: The Kennedy Case." Presidential Studies Quarterly 8.4 (1978): 391-403. online
- Craig, Campbell. "Kennedy's international legacy, fifty years on." International affairs 89.6 (2013): 1367-1378. online
- Dunne, Michael. "Kennedy's Alliance for Progress: countering revolution in Latin America Part II: the historiographical record." International Affairs 92.2 (2016): 435–452. online
- Kaufman, Burton I. "John F. Kennedy as world leader: A perspective on the literature." Diplomatic History 17.3 (1993): 447-470. online
- LaRosa, Michael J. and Frank O. Mora, eds. Neighborly Adversaries: Readings in U.S.–Latin American Relations (2006).
- Leuchtenburg, William E. "John F. Kennedy: Twenty Years Later." American Heritage 35 (1983): 51–59.
- Ripley, Brian Dale. "Rethinking groupthink: Foreign policy decision-making in the Kennedy and Johnson administrations" (PhD Diss. The Ohio State University, 1989) online.
- Selverstone, Marc J. "Eternal Flaming: The Historiography of Kennedy Foreign Policy," Passport: The Newsletter of the SHAFR (April 2015), 46#1, pp 22–29.
- Selverstone, Marc J. ed. A Companion to John F. Kennedy (2014) chapters 11-25 pp 207–496
- Walton, Jennifer Lynn. "Moral masculinity: the culture of foreign relations during the Kennedy administration" (PhD The Ohio State University, 2004) online.
- Wander, Philip. "The rhetoric of American foreign policy." Quarterly Journal of Speech 70.4 (1984): 339-361.
- White, Mark J. "New Scholarship on the Cuban Missile Crisis." Diplomatic History 26.1 (2002): 147–153.
