= National Security Action Memorandum 263 =

United States national security directive

National Security Action Memorandum Number 263 (NSAM-263) was a national security directive approved on 11 October 1963 by United States President John F. Kennedy. The NSAM approved recommendations by Secretary of Defense Robert McNamara and Chairman of the Joint Chiefs of Staff General Maxwell Taylor. McNamara and Taylor's recommendations included an appraisal that "great progress" was being made in the Vietnam War against Viet Cong insurgents, that 1,000 military personnel could be withdrawn from South Vietnam by the end of 1963, and that a "major part of the U.S. military task can be completed by the end of 1965." The U.S. at this time had more than 16,000 military personnel in South Vietnam.

NSAM-263 has served as an important source for many authors who have claimed that President Kennedy planned to withdraw U.S. military forces from Vietnam and would have completed the withdrawal after achieving reelection in 1964.

== Background ==
In September 1963, South Vietnam was in the midst of a political crisis and U.S. policymakers were in disagreement about how to proceed. The brutal repression of anti-government demonstrations had eroded support for the government of President Ngo Dinh Diem in both South Vietnam and the United States. Kennedy's new Ambassador in Saigon, Henry Cabot Lodge Jr., was expressing support for South Vietnamese military leaders who wished to overthrow the Diem government. At the same time, however, the head of the U.S. Military Assistance Command, Vietnam (MACV), General Paul D. Harkins claimed that the military situation was improving in the war against the insurgent Viet Cong

To assess the situation, Secretary of Defense Robert McNamara and the Chairman of the Joint Chiefs of Staff General Maxwell Taylor visited South Vietnam from September 23, to October 2. President Kennedy instructed them to produce "the best possible on-the-spot appraisal of the military and paramilitary effort to defeat the Viet Cong." The report that McNamara and Taylor submitted to the President said that "the military campaign has made great progress" and cited "present favorable military trends."McNamara and Taylor also concluded "there is no solid evidence of the possibility of a successful coup" against the Diem government.

McNamara and Taylor recommended that the U.S. persuade the South Vietnamese to make a number of changes in its military effort to complete the military campaign by the end of 1965 which would enable the U.S. to "withdraw the bulk of U.S. personnel by that time." McNamara and Taylor supported a plan, proposed by McNamara in July 1963, to withdraw 1,000 U.S. military personnel from South Vietnam by the end of 1963. Other recommendations were to suspend or reduce economic aid programs to South Vietnam as a sign of U.S. dissatisfaction with the Diem government and to pressure Diem into making necessary reforms. The White House issued a public statement on October 2, declaring its intention to withdraw 1,000 soldiers from Vietnam by the end of 1963 and the same announcement was made in Saigon by MACV on 16 October.

On October 5, after meetings of McNamara and Taylor with President Kennedy and acting on the McNamara/Taylor recommendations, the Department of State with Kennedy's approval instructed Ambassador Lodge in South Vietnam to press President Diệm on a number of issues. Pending favorable action of the part of Diệm, some economic aid programs would be suspended which, in the view of the State Department, would not have an adverse impact on the war against the Viet Cong for two to four months. Among other things, Diệm was to be enjoined to cease criticism of the United States and to focus on a serious military situation in the Mekong Delta. His strategy should be to hold territory and protect the rural population rather than having the ARVN undertake military sweeps of only temporary value.

== NSAM 263 ==
National Security Action Memorandum No. 263 was approved by President Kennedy on 11 October. NSAM 263 accepted the military recommendations of McNamara and Taylor, as follows: (1) changes to be accomplished by the government of South Vietnam to improve its military performance; (2) a training program for Vietnamese "so that essential functions can be carried out by Vietnamese by the end of 1965. It should be possible to withdraw the bulk of U.S. personnel by that time"; and (3) withdrawal as previously planned of 1,000 U.S. military personnel by the end of 1963. NSAM 263 specifies that no formal announcement be made of the withdrawal.

NSAM 263 was revealed to the public in 1971 in the Pentagon Papers.

== Impact and controversy ==
The policies adopted in NSAM-263 were quickly overtaken by events. McNamara and Taylor's doubt that a successful coup d'etat would take place in South Vietnam proved mistaken when President Diem was overthrown and killed on 2 November. The coup was followed by Kennedy's assassination on November 22, and in December by a change of opinion by McNamara who came to the conclusion that "current trends [in South Vietnam], unless reversed in the next 2–3 months, will lead to neutralization at best and more likely to a Communist-controlled state."

Nevertheless, the withdrawal of almost 1,000 U.S. military personnel from South Vietnam took place, albeit described by the Pentagon Papers as an "accounting exercise." The number of soldiers in South Vietnam was 16,752 in October and on December 31, was 15,894.

Many historians, Kennedy acolytes, and celebrities, such as movie director Oliver Stone, have claimed that the withdrawal of 1,000 U.S. soldiers from Vietnam was the beginning of Kennedy's plan to withdraw completely from South Vietnam after he gained re-election in 1964 and cited NSAM-263 as evidence for that plan. Others, including Pulitzer Prize winning historian Fredrik Logevall, have said that "NSAM 263 hardly represented the kind of far-reaching policy initiative that the incipient-withdrawal proponents suggest. It was but one part of a larger 'selective pressures' policy designed to push the Diem regime into greater effectiveness." Logevall concluded that "The great preponderance of the evidence...would appear to refute any notion that John Kennedy had decided to withdraw from Vietnam." However, Logevall goes on to speculate that Kennedy, because of his character and personality, might have considered, at a later date, a unilateral withdrawal of American forces from Vietnam.

NSAM 273, approved by new U.S. President Lyndon Johnson one day after Kennedy's funeral on November 26, 1963, affirmed the withdrawal called for in NSAM 263, saying "The objectives of the United States with respect to the withdrawal of U. S. military personnel remain as stated in the White House statement of October 2, 1963."

== See also ==
- 1963 South Vietnamese coup, 1–2 November 1963
