= National Security Action Memorandum 273 =

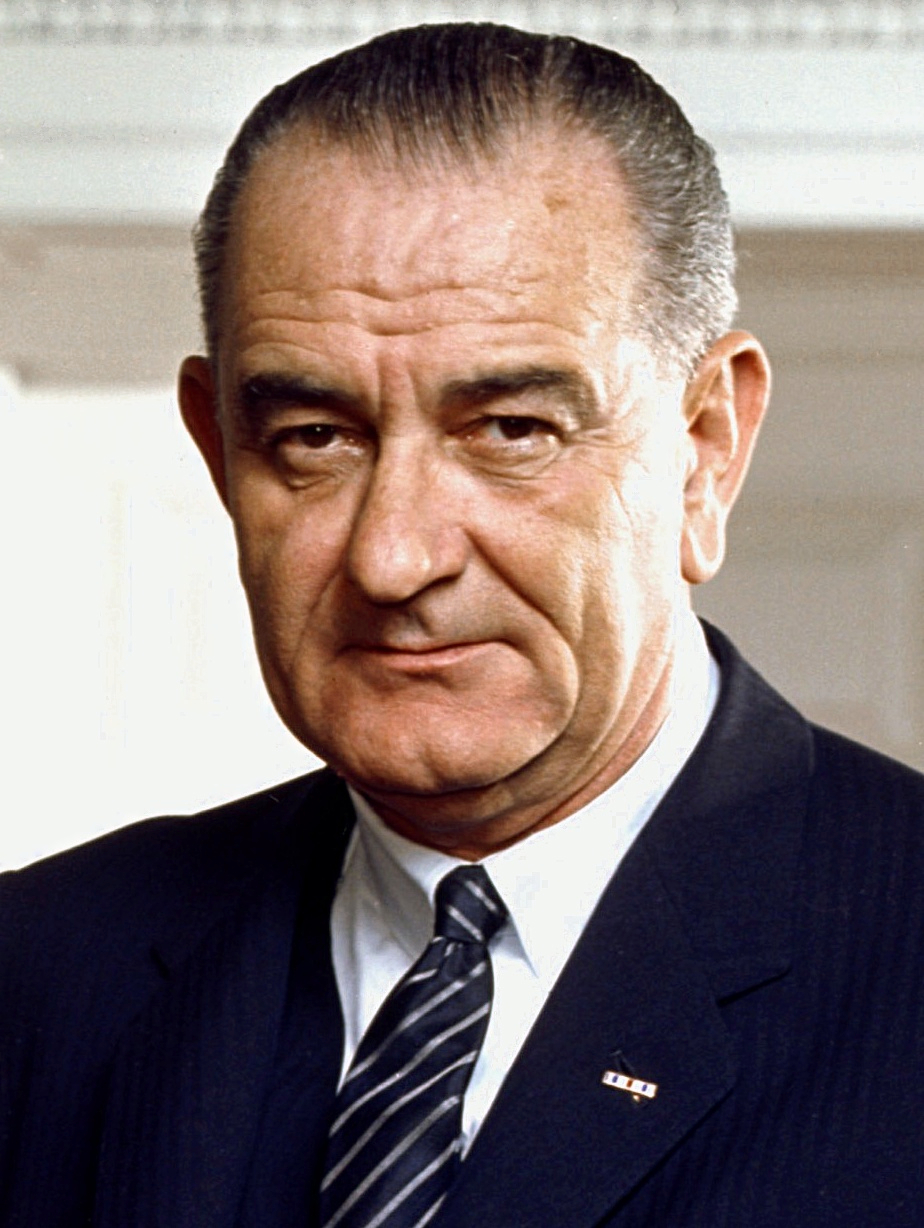
Lyndon Johnson

National Security Action Memorandum 273 (NSAM-273) was approved by new United States President Lyndon Johnson on November 26, 1963, one day after former President John F. Kennedy's funeral. NSAM-273 resulted from the need to reassess U.S. policy toward the Vietnam War following the overthrow and assassination of President Ngo Dinh Diem. The first draft of NSAM-273, completed before Kennedy's death, was approved with minor changes by President Johnson.

As the initial statement – top secret at the time – of U.S. policy in the Vietnam War of the Johnson presidency, NSAM-273 has been studied carefully to determine if it changed policies toward Vietnam from those of the Kennedy presidency. NSAM-273 and previous NSAMs were based on an optimistic view of progress in the Vietnam War. The strategy outlined in NSAM-273 was quickly overtaken by events. U.S. policy makers became more pessimistic and this led to escalation of U.S. military activity in Vietnam on March 8, 1965.

== Background ==
With the coup d'état and assassination of President Diem on November 2, 1963, the Kennedy Administration faced a new situation in South Vietnam. President Kennedy ordered a "full-scale review" of U.S. policy and on 20 November his principal foreign policy advisers (numbering 45 persons in total) met in Honolulu, Hawaii. The advisers at the meeting were optimistic, concluding there was "an encouraging outlook for the principle objective of joint U.S.-Vietnamese policy in South Vietnam – the successful prosecution of the war against the Viet Cong communists." Also, the U.S. Ambassador to South Vietnam Henry Cabot Lodge Jr. and Military Assistance Command Vietnam (MACV) commander General Paul D. Harkins reported "excellent working relations" with the leadership of the new South Vietnamese government. While National Security Action Memorandum 263, the result of a meeting that took place on October 5, 1963, had cited called for the withdraw of 1,000 U.S. military personnel from South Vietnam by the end of 1963 and explicitly stipulated that no formal announcement should be made, National Security Action Memorandum 273 referred to a slightly earlier White House statement, inverting the date of the meeting in order to apply continuity with President Kennedy's policy: "The objectives of the United States with respect to the withdrawal of U.S. military personnel remain as stated in the White House statement of October 2, 1963."

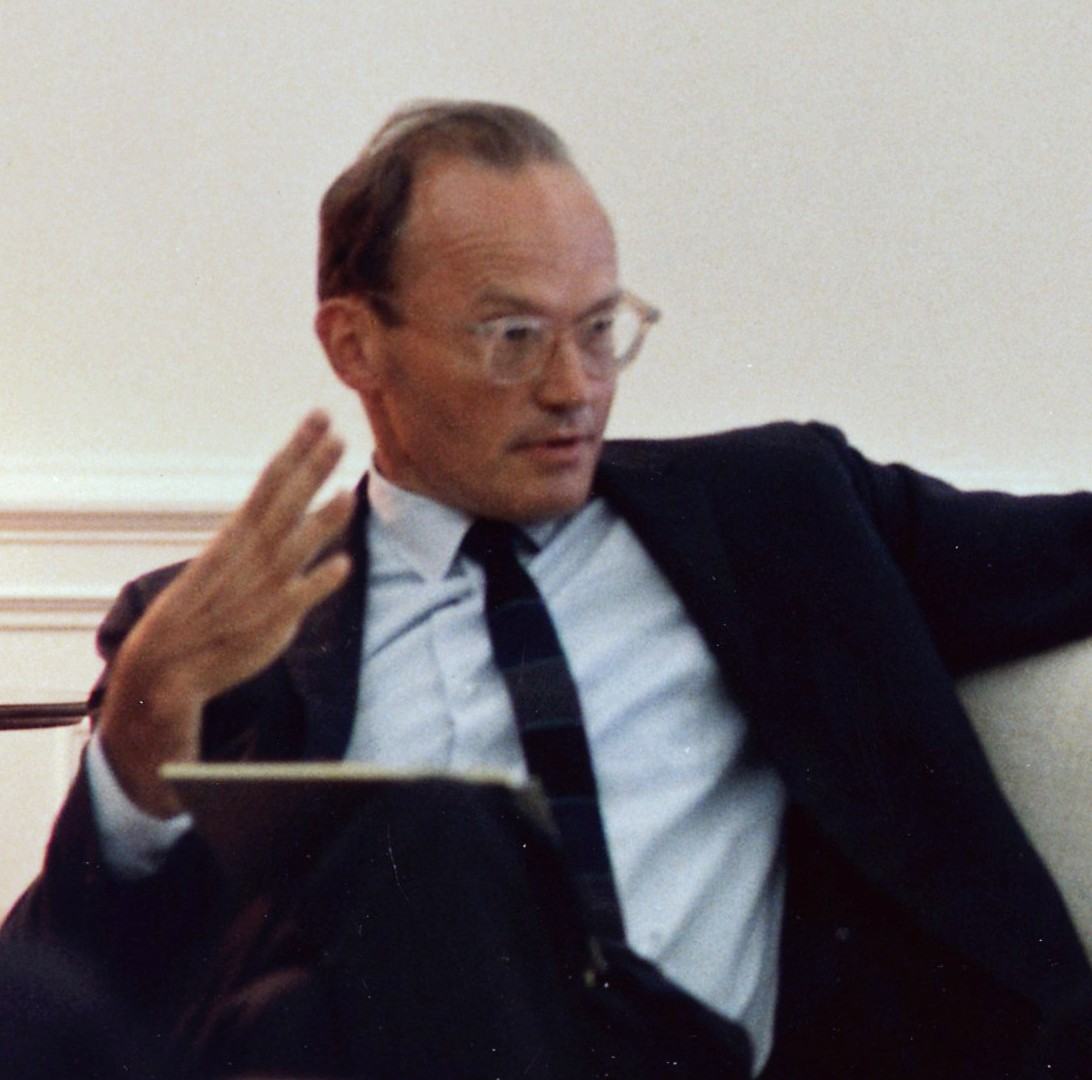
McGeorge Bundy, who wrote the memo's first draft

After the conclusion of the Hawaii meeting, on November 21, National Security Advisor McGeorge Bundy wrote the first draft of what was to be NSAM-273. There are no indications that Kennedy saw the draft before his assassination on November 22.

== NSAM-273 ==
NSAM-273 consists of 10 paragraphs of which 8 are identical with the Bundy draft of November 21. Paragraph 4 and 7 had been changed. Paragraph 4 is more emphatic than Bundy's draft. It exhorts "unity of support for established U.S. policy in South Vietnam" and places "particular importance" on avoiding criticism of other U.S. government officials and agencies. This was an attempt by Johnson to stifle policy disputes in Washington among his chief advisers and in Saigon between Ambassador Lodge and General Harkins. The changes in Paragraph 7 of Bundy's draft are related to prosecution of the war. Bundy had said that there should be a detailed plan by South Vietnam for taking action against North Vietnam. NSAM-273 as adopted is more specific, detailing the purposes of planning – but not confining such planning to action by South Vietnam, implying that the U.S. would assist and participate in covert action in North Vietnam. The strengthening of this paragraph seems to have been at the behest of the U.S. military which believed that many of South Vietnam's problems originated in North Vietnam and that action should be taken against the North.

The most discussed part of NSAM 273 is Paragraph 2 which affirmed the withdrawal called for in NSAM 263. stating "The objectives of the United States with respect to the withdrawal of U.S. military personnel remain as stated in the White House statement of October 2, 1963." (The White House statement of 2 October, among other things, declared the intention to withdraw 1,000 soldiers from Vietnam by end of the 1963.) Paragraph 5 reflects that long-standing U.S. opinion that the military and pacification efforts of South Vietnam should be focused on the Mekong Delta where the situation is "critical." Paragraph 6 says that aid to the new South Vietnamese government should be maintained at least at levels provided to the previous Diem government. Paragraphs 8 and 9 deal with U.S. plans in neighboring Laos and Cambodia. Paragraph 10 says that the U.S. "should develop as strong and persuasive a case as possible to demonstrate to the world the degree to which the Viet Cong is controlled, sustained and supplied" from North Vietnam.

== Aftermath ==
The withdrawal of almost 1,000 U.S. military personnel from South Vietnam took place, albeit described by the Pentagon Papers as an "accounting exercise." The number of soldiers in South Vietnam was 16,752 in October and on December 31, 1963, was 15,894.

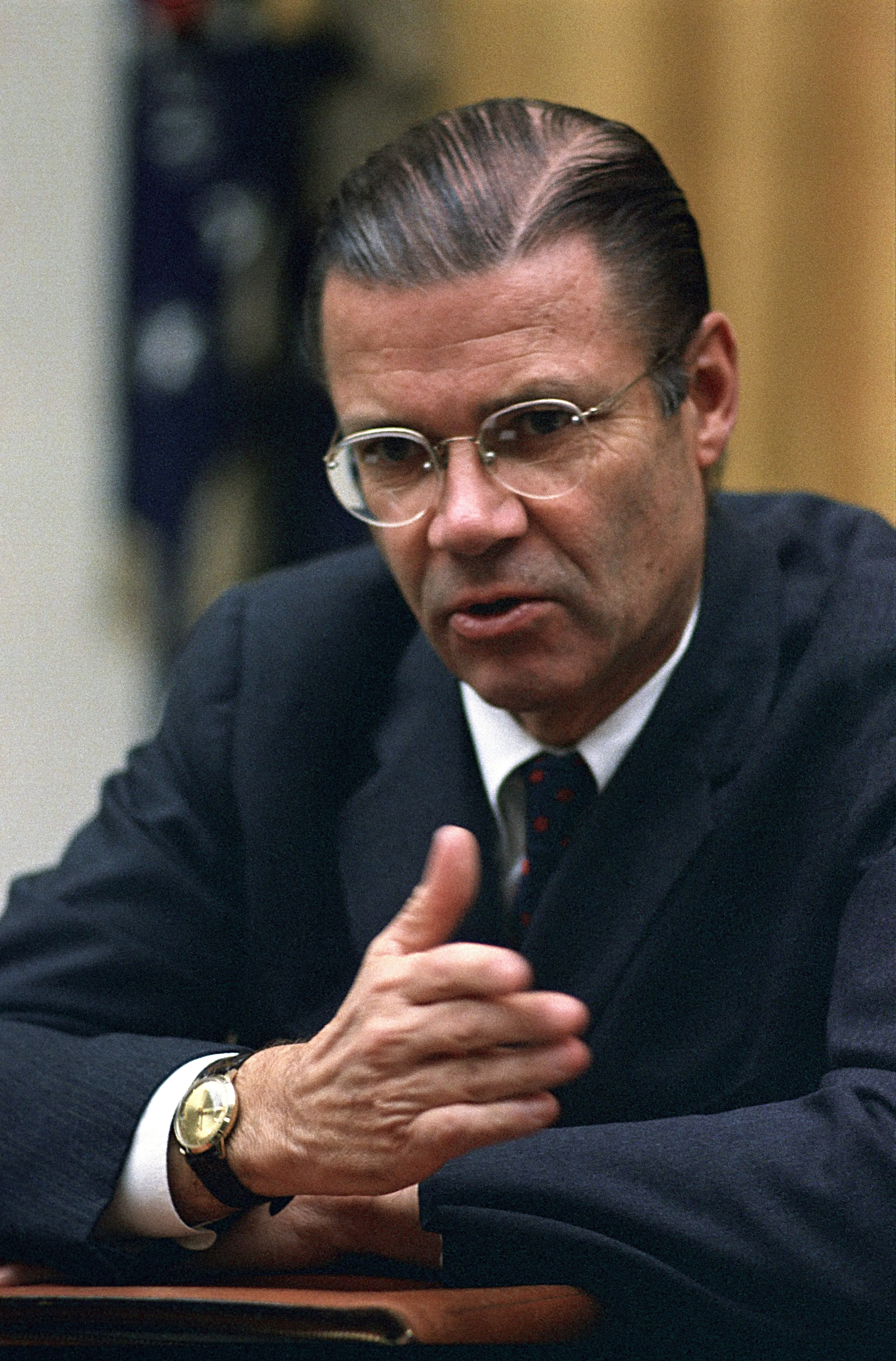
Robert McNamara

Presidents Kennedy and Johnson had made decisions on the Vietnam War based on optimistic reports from the American Embassy and MACV in Saigon and from frequent assessment missions by U.S. policy makers. (The dissenters included some lower-level employees in the Department of State, CIA, the U.S. military, and U.S. journalists in South Vietnam.) The ink was barely dry on NSAM 273 when those optimistic assessments turned pessimistic. With dissension increasing among U.S. policy makers (Ambassador Lodge vs General Harkins in Saigon; Presidential advisor General Maxwell D. Taylor vs other military leaders in Washington) and reports of Viet Cong successes, Johnson sent Secretary of Defense Robert McNamara and Taylor back to Vietnam for another assessment. McNamara's report of December 20, 1963, was far more pessimistic that his previous assessments. He said, "The situation is very disturbing. Current trends, unless reversed in the next 2–3 months, will lead to neutralization at best and most likely to a Communist-controlled state." McNamara also criticized the ineffectiveness of the new South Vietnamese government, formed after the assassination of President Diem.

The immediate response of the U.S. government to its sudden realization that the political and military situation in South Vietnam was not good was to expand the U.S.'s role in the Vietnam War. NSAM 273 had defined the "central object" of the U.S. "to assist the people and Government [of South Vietnam] to win their contest against the externally directed and supported Communist conspiracy." Escalating the U.S. objectives, on January 22, 1964, the Joint Chiefs of Staff sent McNamara a memo declaring "victory" to be the U.S. objective and recommending that the U.S. "put aside many of the self-imposed restrictions which now limit our efforts and undertake bolder actions which may embody greater risks." On 30 January another coup d'etat in Saigon emphasized to the U.S. policy makers the instability of the South Vietnamese government. Disarray in Saigon was accompanied by policy wars in Washington between the Departments of State and Defense and within the Department of Defense. A series of decisions on Mar. 8, 1965 to escalate U.S. involvement in Vietnam was the result.
