= Stephen G. Rabe =

American historian

Stephen G. Rabe is a historian based in the United States. Born in Hartford, Connecticut, he received degrees from Hamilton College and the University of Connecticut. His areas of interest include the relations between the US and Latin America, the Vietnam War, and slavery in the United States. Rabe has held a Fulbright Distinguished Chair and the Bicentennial Chair in American Studies at the University of Helsinki.

Rabe's work has been recognized by grants, awards, and prizes from the National Endowment for the Humanities, the American Historical Association, the Lyndon Baines Johnson Foundation, the Rockefeller Archive Center, the Eleanor Roosevelt Institute, the Harvey O. Johnson Prize, the Stuart L. Bernath Prize from the Society for Historians of American Foreign Relations, and the Bernath Lecture Prize.

== Bibliography ==
- Rabe, Stephen G. (1982). The Road to OPEC: United States Relations with Venezuela, 1919-1976. University of Texas Press. ISBN 978-0-292-74153-9.
- Rabe, Stephen G. (1988). Eisenhower and Latin America: The Foreign Policy of Anticommunism. University of North Carolina press. ISBN 0807842044.
- Rabe, Stephen G. (1999). The Most Dangerous Area in the World: John F. Kennedy Confronts Communist Revolution in Latin America. The University of North Carolina Press. ISBN 080784764X.
- Rabe, Stephen G. (2005). U.S. Intervention in British Guiana: A Cold War Story. University of North Carolina Press. ISBN 0-8078-5639-8.
- Rabe, Stephen G. (2010). John F. Kennedy: World Leader. Potomac Books. ISBN 978-1597971485.
- Rabe, Stephen G. (2015) [2011]. The Killing Zone: The United States Wages Cold War in Latin America (2nd ed.). Oxford University Press. ISBN 978-0195333237.
- Rabe, Stephen G. (2020). Kissinger and Latin America: Intervention, Human Rights, and Diplomacy. Cornell University Press. ISBN 978-1501706295.
- Rabe, Stephen G. (2022). The Lost Paratroopers of Normandy: A Story of Resistance, Courage, and Solidarity in a French Village. Cambridge University Press. ISBN 978-1009206372.
